

83001–83100 

|-bgcolor=#d6d6d6
| 83001 ||  || — || August 23, 2001 || Anderson Mesa || LONEOS || — || align=right | 5.9 km || 
|-id=002 bgcolor=#E9E9E9
| 83002 ||  || — || August 23, 2001 || Anderson Mesa || LONEOS || NEM || align=right | 4.1 km || 
|-id=003 bgcolor=#E9E9E9
| 83003 ||  || — || August 23, 2001 || Anderson Mesa || LONEOS || — || align=right | 4.8 km || 
|-id=004 bgcolor=#d6d6d6
| 83004 ||  || — || August 23, 2001 || Anderson Mesa || LONEOS || HYG || align=right | 5.3 km || 
|-id=005 bgcolor=#E9E9E9
| 83005 ||  || — || August 23, 2001 || Anderson Mesa || LONEOS || — || align=right | 4.1 km || 
|-id=006 bgcolor=#d6d6d6
| 83006 ||  || — || August 23, 2001 || Anderson Mesa || LONEOS || THM || align=right | 7.5 km || 
|-id=007 bgcolor=#d6d6d6
| 83007 ||  || — || August 23, 2001 || Anderson Mesa || LONEOS || HYG || align=right | 8.2 km || 
|-id=008 bgcolor=#d6d6d6
| 83008 ||  || — || August 31, 2001 || Desert Eagle || W. K. Y. Yeung || EOS || align=right | 5.3 km || 
|-id=009 bgcolor=#fefefe
| 83009 ||  || — || August 21, 2001 || Palomar || NEAT || — || align=right | 3.1 km || 
|-id=010 bgcolor=#E9E9E9
| 83010 ||  || — || August 22, 2001 || Haleakala || NEAT || — || align=right | 2.8 km || 
|-id=011 bgcolor=#d6d6d6
| 83011 ||  || — || August 24, 2001 || Haleakala || NEAT || — || align=right | 4.2 km || 
|-id=012 bgcolor=#fefefe
| 83012 ||  || — || August 24, 2001 || Haleakala || NEAT || — || align=right | 1.3 km || 
|-id=013 bgcolor=#E9E9E9
| 83013 ||  || — || August 26, 2001 || Haleakala || NEAT || — || align=right | 5.2 km || 
|-id=014 bgcolor=#d6d6d6
| 83014 ||  || — || August 23, 2001 || Socorro || LINEAR || — || align=right | 6.5 km || 
|-id=015 bgcolor=#E9E9E9
| 83015 ||  || — || August 23, 2001 || Socorro || LINEAR || — || align=right | 1.7 km || 
|-id=016 bgcolor=#E9E9E9
| 83016 ||  || — || August 24, 2001 || Socorro || LINEAR || EUN || align=right | 2.7 km || 
|-id=017 bgcolor=#E9E9E9
| 83017 ||  || — || August 24, 2001 || Socorro || LINEAR || HOF || align=right | 5.8 km || 
|-id=018 bgcolor=#d6d6d6
| 83018 ||  || — || August 25, 2001 || Socorro || LINEAR || — || align=right | 5.0 km || 
|-id=019 bgcolor=#fefefe
| 83019 ||  || — || August 25, 2001 || Socorro || LINEAR || V || align=right | 1.5 km || 
|-id=020 bgcolor=#E9E9E9
| 83020 ||  || — || August 21, 2001 || Haleakala || NEAT || — || align=right | 2.8 km || 
|-id=021 bgcolor=#d6d6d6
| 83021 ||  || — || August 25, 2001 || Palomar || NEAT || HYG || align=right | 8.3 km || 
|-id=022 bgcolor=#E9E9E9
| 83022 ||  || — || August 26, 2001 || Palomar || NEAT || — || align=right | 2.7 km || 
|-id=023 bgcolor=#d6d6d6
| 83023 ||  || — || August 24, 2001 || Kvistaberg || UDAS || — || align=right | 9.3 km || 
|-id=024 bgcolor=#E9E9E9
| 83024 ||  || — || August 27, 2001 || Palomar || NEAT || — || align=right | 2.6 km || 
|-id=025 bgcolor=#d6d6d6
| 83025 ||  || — || August 28, 2001 || Palomar || NEAT || — || align=right | 5.6 km || 
|-id=026 bgcolor=#fefefe
| 83026 ||  || — || August 25, 2001 || Palomar || NEAT || — || align=right | 2.0 km || 
|-id=027 bgcolor=#E9E9E9
| 83027 ||  || — || August 25, 2001 || Palomar || NEAT || — || align=right | 5.1 km || 
|-id=028 bgcolor=#E9E9E9
| 83028 ||  || — || August 25, 2001 || Palomar || NEAT || — || align=right | 4.7 km || 
|-id=029 bgcolor=#E9E9E9
| 83029 ||  || — || August 26, 2001 || Palomar || NEAT || — || align=right | 6.0 km || 
|-id=030 bgcolor=#fefefe
| 83030 ||  || — || August 26, 2001 || Palomar || NEAT || — || align=right | 2.6 km || 
|-id=031 bgcolor=#d6d6d6
| 83031 ||  || — || August 28, 2001 || Palomar || NEAT || HYG || align=right | 7.4 km || 
|-id=032 bgcolor=#E9E9E9
| 83032 ||  || — || August 31, 2001 || Palomar || NEAT || — || align=right | 2.0 km || 
|-id=033 bgcolor=#E9E9E9
| 83033 ||  || — || August 30, 2001 || Palomar || NEAT || — || align=right | 5.0 km || 
|-id=034 bgcolor=#d6d6d6
| 83034 ||  || — || August 24, 2001 || Socorro || LINEAR || — || align=right | 6.5 km || 
|-id=035 bgcolor=#d6d6d6
| 83035 ||  || — || August 21, 2001 || Kitt Peak || Spacewatch || — || align=right | 4.8 km || 
|-id=036 bgcolor=#d6d6d6
| 83036 ||  || — || August 21, 2001 || Socorro || LINEAR || ARM || align=right | 8.6 km || 
|-id=037 bgcolor=#E9E9E9
| 83037 ||  || — || August 21, 2001 || Haleakala || NEAT || MAR || align=right | 2.4 km || 
|-id=038 bgcolor=#fefefe
| 83038 ||  || — || August 22, 2001 || Socorro || LINEAR || — || align=right | 2.5 km || 
|-id=039 bgcolor=#d6d6d6
| 83039 ||  || — || August 22, 2001 || Socorro || LINEAR || — || align=right | 7.1 km || 
|-id=040 bgcolor=#E9E9E9
| 83040 ||  || — || August 22, 2001 || Socorro || LINEAR || — || align=right | 4.7 km || 
|-id=041 bgcolor=#d6d6d6
| 83041 ||  || — || August 22, 2001 || Socorro || LINEAR || — || align=right | 8.5 km || 
|-id=042 bgcolor=#d6d6d6
| 83042 ||  || — || August 22, 2001 || Socorro || LINEAR || — || align=right | 11 km || 
|-id=043 bgcolor=#d6d6d6
| 83043 ||  || — || August 22, 2001 || Socorro || LINEAR || — || align=right | 8.4 km || 
|-id=044 bgcolor=#E9E9E9
| 83044 ||  || — || August 22, 2001 || Socorro || LINEAR || — || align=right | 4.1 km || 
|-id=045 bgcolor=#d6d6d6
| 83045 ||  || — || August 22, 2001 || Socorro || LINEAR || — || align=right | 8.3 km || 
|-id=046 bgcolor=#d6d6d6
| 83046 ||  || — || August 22, 2001 || Socorro || LINEAR || — || align=right | 8.4 km || 
|-id=047 bgcolor=#d6d6d6
| 83047 ||  || — || August 22, 2001 || Socorro || LINEAR || — || align=right | 7.1 km || 
|-id=048 bgcolor=#E9E9E9
| 83048 ||  || — || August 22, 2001 || Socorro || LINEAR || — || align=right | 2.6 km || 
|-id=049 bgcolor=#E9E9E9
| 83049 ||  || — || August 22, 2001 || Haleakala || NEAT || — || align=right | 5.1 km || 
|-id=050 bgcolor=#E9E9E9
| 83050 ||  || — || August 22, 2001 || Socorro || LINEAR || — || align=right | 3.6 km || 
|-id=051 bgcolor=#d6d6d6
| 83051 ||  || — || August 22, 2001 || Palomar || NEAT || URS || align=right | 13 km || 
|-id=052 bgcolor=#E9E9E9
| 83052 ||  || — || August 22, 2001 || Socorro || LINEAR || — || align=right | 5.5 km || 
|-id=053 bgcolor=#d6d6d6
| 83053 ||  || — || August 22, 2001 || Kitt Peak || Spacewatch || EOS || align=right | 4.4 km || 
|-id=054 bgcolor=#E9E9E9
| 83054 ||  || — || August 23, 2001 || Kitt Peak || Spacewatch || HOF || align=right | 5.2 km || 
|-id=055 bgcolor=#d6d6d6
| 83055 ||  || — || August 23, 2001 || Anderson Mesa || LONEOS || — || align=right | 6.5 km || 
|-id=056 bgcolor=#d6d6d6
| 83056 ||  || — || August 23, 2001 || Anderson Mesa || LONEOS || EOS || align=right | 4.5 km || 
|-id=057 bgcolor=#E9E9E9
| 83057 ||  || — || August 23, 2001 || Anderson Mesa || LONEOS || — || align=right | 4.7 km || 
|-id=058 bgcolor=#d6d6d6
| 83058 ||  || — || August 23, 2001 || Anderson Mesa || LONEOS || KOR || align=right | 3.1 km || 
|-id=059 bgcolor=#E9E9E9
| 83059 ||  || — || August 23, 2001 || Anderson Mesa || LONEOS || GEF || align=right | 3.1 km || 
|-id=060 bgcolor=#E9E9E9
| 83060 ||  || — || August 23, 2001 || Kitt Peak || Spacewatch || MAR || align=right | 2.2 km || 
|-id=061 bgcolor=#d6d6d6
| 83061 ||  || — || August 23, 2001 || Anderson Mesa || LONEOS || MEL || align=right | 8.4 km || 
|-id=062 bgcolor=#E9E9E9
| 83062 ||  || — || August 23, 2001 || Anderson Mesa || LONEOS || — || align=right | 3.2 km || 
|-id=063 bgcolor=#d6d6d6
| 83063 ||  || — || August 23, 2001 || Anderson Mesa || LONEOS || — || align=right | 5.4 km || 
|-id=064 bgcolor=#d6d6d6
| 83064 ||  || — || August 23, 2001 || Anderson Mesa || LONEOS || — || align=right | 5.8 km || 
|-id=065 bgcolor=#d6d6d6
| 83065 ||  || — || August 23, 2001 || Anderson Mesa || LONEOS || KOR || align=right | 3.4 km || 
|-id=066 bgcolor=#d6d6d6
| 83066 ||  || — || August 23, 2001 || Anderson Mesa || LONEOS || HYG || align=right | 4.6 km || 
|-id=067 bgcolor=#E9E9E9
| 83067 ||  || — || August 23, 2001 || Anderson Mesa || LONEOS || — || align=right | 3.4 km || 
|-id=068 bgcolor=#E9E9E9
| 83068 ||  || — || August 23, 2001 || Anderson Mesa || LONEOS || NEM || align=right | 6.0 km || 
|-id=069 bgcolor=#E9E9E9
| 83069 ||  || — || August 23, 2001 || Anderson Mesa || LONEOS || MAR || align=right | 2.7 km || 
|-id=070 bgcolor=#E9E9E9
| 83070 ||  || — || August 23, 2001 || Anderson Mesa || LONEOS || — || align=right | 4.7 km || 
|-id=071 bgcolor=#E9E9E9
| 83071 ||  || — || August 23, 2001 || Anderson Mesa || LONEOS || — || align=right | 5.4 km || 
|-id=072 bgcolor=#d6d6d6
| 83072 ||  || — || August 23, 2001 || Anderson Mesa || LONEOS || NAE || align=right | 5.9 km || 
|-id=073 bgcolor=#d6d6d6
| 83073 ||  || — || August 23, 2001 || Anderson Mesa || LONEOS || KAR || align=right | 2.2 km || 
|-id=074 bgcolor=#d6d6d6
| 83074 ||  || — || August 23, 2001 || Anderson Mesa || LONEOS || KOR || align=right | 2.6 km || 
|-id=075 bgcolor=#E9E9E9
| 83075 ||  || — || August 23, 2001 || Anderson Mesa || LONEOS || HEN || align=right | 2.4 km || 
|-id=076 bgcolor=#E9E9E9
| 83076 ||  || — || August 23, 2001 || Anderson Mesa || LONEOS || — || align=right | 5.2 km || 
|-id=077 bgcolor=#fefefe
| 83077 ||  || — || August 23, 2001 || Anderson Mesa || LONEOS || NYS || align=right | 1.4 km || 
|-id=078 bgcolor=#d6d6d6
| 83078 ||  || — || August 24, 2001 || Palomar || NEAT || — || align=right | 6.0 km || 
|-id=079 bgcolor=#d6d6d6
| 83079 ||  || — || August 24, 2001 || Anderson Mesa || LONEOS || — || align=right | 5.4 km || 
|-id=080 bgcolor=#E9E9E9
| 83080 ||  || — || August 24, 2001 || Anderson Mesa || LONEOS || WIT || align=right | 1.9 km || 
|-id=081 bgcolor=#d6d6d6
| 83081 ||  || — || August 24, 2001 || Palomar || NEAT || — || align=right | 4.7 km || 
|-id=082 bgcolor=#E9E9E9
| 83082 ||  || — || August 24, 2001 || Anderson Mesa || LONEOS || — || align=right | 2.4 km || 
|-id=083 bgcolor=#E9E9E9
| 83083 ||  || — || August 24, 2001 || Anderson Mesa || LONEOS || — || align=right | 4.0 km || 
|-id=084 bgcolor=#d6d6d6
| 83084 ||  || — || August 24, 2001 || Anderson Mesa || LONEOS || — || align=right | 7.4 km || 
|-id=085 bgcolor=#d6d6d6
| 83085 ||  || — || August 24, 2001 || Anderson Mesa || LONEOS || — || align=right | 4.0 km || 
|-id=086 bgcolor=#d6d6d6
| 83086 ||  || — || August 24, 2001 || Anderson Mesa || LONEOS || EOS || align=right | 4.9 km || 
|-id=087 bgcolor=#E9E9E9
| 83087 ||  || — || August 24, 2001 || Anderson Mesa || LONEOS || — || align=right | 2.4 km || 
|-id=088 bgcolor=#E9E9E9
| 83088 ||  || — || August 24, 2001 || Anderson Mesa || LONEOS || — || align=right | 3.2 km || 
|-id=089 bgcolor=#E9E9E9
| 83089 ||  || — || August 24, 2001 || Anderson Mesa || LONEOS || WIT || align=right | 1.9 km || 
|-id=090 bgcolor=#d6d6d6
| 83090 ||  || — || August 24, 2001 || Desert Eagle || W. K. Y. Yeung || THM || align=right | 6.0 km || 
|-id=091 bgcolor=#d6d6d6
| 83091 ||  || — || August 24, 2001 || Desert Eagle || W. K. Y. Yeung || KOR || align=right | 2.7 km || 
|-id=092 bgcolor=#d6d6d6
| 83092 ||  || — || August 24, 2001 || Socorro || LINEAR || KOR || align=right | 3.0 km || 
|-id=093 bgcolor=#d6d6d6
| 83093 ||  || — || August 24, 2001 || Socorro || LINEAR || — || align=right | 4.9 km || 
|-id=094 bgcolor=#d6d6d6
| 83094 ||  || — || August 24, 2001 || Socorro || LINEAR || — || align=right | 5.8 km || 
|-id=095 bgcolor=#d6d6d6
| 83095 ||  || — || August 24, 2001 || Socorro || LINEAR || KOR || align=right | 2.7 km || 
|-id=096 bgcolor=#d6d6d6
| 83096 ||  || — || August 24, 2001 || Socorro || LINEAR || KOR || align=right | 2.8 km || 
|-id=097 bgcolor=#d6d6d6
| 83097 ||  || — || August 24, 2001 || Socorro || LINEAR || — || align=right | 5.4 km || 
|-id=098 bgcolor=#E9E9E9
| 83098 ||  || — || August 24, 2001 || Socorro || LINEAR || — || align=right | 3.3 km || 
|-id=099 bgcolor=#E9E9E9
| 83099 ||  || — || August 24, 2001 || Socorro || LINEAR || — || align=right | 3.0 km || 
|-id=100 bgcolor=#d6d6d6
| 83100 ||  || — || August 24, 2001 || Socorro || LINEAR || URS || align=right | 8.1 km || 
|}

83101–83200 

|-bgcolor=#d6d6d6
| 83101 ||  || — || August 24, 2001 || Socorro || LINEAR || HYG || align=right | 7.2 km || 
|-id=102 bgcolor=#E9E9E9
| 83102 ||  || — || August 24, 2001 || Socorro || LINEAR || — || align=right | 3.6 km || 
|-id=103 bgcolor=#d6d6d6
| 83103 ||  || — || August 24, 2001 || Socorro || LINEAR || — || align=right | 5.6 km || 
|-id=104 bgcolor=#d6d6d6
| 83104 ||  || — || August 24, 2001 || Socorro || LINEAR || KOR || align=right | 3.6 km || 
|-id=105 bgcolor=#d6d6d6
| 83105 ||  || — || August 24, 2001 || Socorro || LINEAR || — || align=right | 10 km || 
|-id=106 bgcolor=#E9E9E9
| 83106 ||  || — || August 24, 2001 || Socorro || LINEAR || WIT || align=right | 2.2 km || 
|-id=107 bgcolor=#E9E9E9
| 83107 ||  || — || August 24, 2001 || Socorro || LINEAR || — || align=right | 4.3 km || 
|-id=108 bgcolor=#d6d6d6
| 83108 ||  || — || August 24, 2001 || Socorro || LINEAR || HYG || align=right | 4.7 km || 
|-id=109 bgcolor=#E9E9E9
| 83109 ||  || — || August 24, 2001 || Socorro || LINEAR || AST || align=right | 5.5 km || 
|-id=110 bgcolor=#d6d6d6
| 83110 ||  || — || August 24, 2001 || Socorro || LINEAR || — || align=right | 5.4 km || 
|-id=111 bgcolor=#E9E9E9
| 83111 ||  || — || August 24, 2001 || Socorro || LINEAR || — || align=right | 3.8 km || 
|-id=112 bgcolor=#E9E9E9
| 83112 ||  || — || August 24, 2001 || Socorro || LINEAR || — || align=right | 2.1 km || 
|-id=113 bgcolor=#E9E9E9
| 83113 ||  || — || August 24, 2001 || Socorro || LINEAR || — || align=right | 2.9 km || 
|-id=114 bgcolor=#E9E9E9
| 83114 ||  || — || August 24, 2001 || Socorro || LINEAR || — || align=right | 1.9 km || 
|-id=115 bgcolor=#d6d6d6
| 83115 ||  || — || August 24, 2001 || Socorro || LINEAR || KOR || align=right | 3.4 km || 
|-id=116 bgcolor=#d6d6d6
| 83116 ||  || — || August 24, 2001 || Socorro || LINEAR || CRO || align=right | 7.2 km || 
|-id=117 bgcolor=#fefefe
| 83117 ||  || — || August 24, 2001 || Socorro || LINEAR || — || align=right | 1.4 km || 
|-id=118 bgcolor=#d6d6d6
| 83118 ||  || — || August 24, 2001 || Socorro || LINEAR || SYL7:4 || align=right | 8.7 km || 
|-id=119 bgcolor=#d6d6d6
| 83119 ||  || — || August 24, 2001 || Socorro || LINEAR || — || align=right | 7.7 km || 
|-id=120 bgcolor=#FA8072
| 83120 ||  || — || August 24, 2001 || Socorro || LINEAR || — || align=right | 1.6 km || 
|-id=121 bgcolor=#E9E9E9
| 83121 ||  || — || August 24, 2001 || Socorro || LINEAR || — || align=right | 3.7 km || 
|-id=122 bgcolor=#d6d6d6
| 83122 ||  || — || August 24, 2001 || Socorro || LINEAR || THM || align=right | 7.5 km || 
|-id=123 bgcolor=#E9E9E9
| 83123 ||  || — || August 24, 2001 || Haleakala || NEAT || — || align=right | 5.2 km || 
|-id=124 bgcolor=#d6d6d6
| 83124 ||  || — || August 24, 2001 || Haleakala || NEAT || 629 || align=right | 3.2 km || 
|-id=125 bgcolor=#fefefe
| 83125 ||  || — || August 25, 2001 || Socorro || LINEAR || V || align=right | 1.3 km || 
|-id=126 bgcolor=#d6d6d6
| 83126 ||  || — || August 25, 2001 || Socorro || LINEAR || — || align=right | 5.9 km || 
|-id=127 bgcolor=#fefefe
| 83127 ||  || — || August 25, 2001 || Socorro || LINEAR || ERI || align=right | 3.3 km || 
|-id=128 bgcolor=#d6d6d6
| 83128 ||  || — || August 25, 2001 || Socorro || LINEAR || — || align=right | 6.6 km || 
|-id=129 bgcolor=#d6d6d6
| 83129 ||  || — || August 25, 2001 || Socorro || LINEAR || — || align=right | 6.8 km || 
|-id=130 bgcolor=#d6d6d6
| 83130 ||  || — || August 25, 2001 || Socorro || LINEAR || — || align=right | 6.4 km || 
|-id=131 bgcolor=#d6d6d6
| 83131 ||  || — || August 25, 2001 || Socorro || LINEAR || — || align=right | 8.1 km || 
|-id=132 bgcolor=#d6d6d6
| 83132 ||  || — || August 25, 2001 || Socorro || LINEAR || EOS || align=right | 5.7 km || 
|-id=133 bgcolor=#d6d6d6
| 83133 ||  || — || August 25, 2001 || Socorro || LINEAR || — || align=right | 7.0 km || 
|-id=134 bgcolor=#d6d6d6
| 83134 ||  || — || August 25, 2001 || Socorro || LINEAR || EOS || align=right | 5.9 km || 
|-id=135 bgcolor=#d6d6d6
| 83135 ||  || — || August 25, 2001 || Socorro || LINEAR || EOS || align=right | 4.1 km || 
|-id=136 bgcolor=#d6d6d6
| 83136 ||  || — || August 25, 2001 || Socorro || LINEAR || URS || align=right | 8.9 km || 
|-id=137 bgcolor=#E9E9E9
| 83137 ||  || — || August 25, 2001 || Socorro || LINEAR || — || align=right | 5.6 km || 
|-id=138 bgcolor=#d6d6d6
| 83138 ||  || — || August 25, 2001 || Socorro || LINEAR || — || align=right | 7.5 km || 
|-id=139 bgcolor=#d6d6d6
| 83139 ||  || — || August 25, 2001 || Socorro || LINEAR || — || align=right | 5.9 km || 
|-id=140 bgcolor=#E9E9E9
| 83140 ||  || — || August 25, 2001 || Palomar || NEAT || MAR || align=right | 2.3 km || 
|-id=141 bgcolor=#fefefe
| 83141 ||  || — || August 25, 2001 || Desert Eagle || W. K. Y. Yeung || — || align=right | 1.3 km || 
|-id=142 bgcolor=#E9E9E9
| 83142 ||  || — || August 25, 2001 || Anderson Mesa || LONEOS || — || align=right | 5.5 km || 
|-id=143 bgcolor=#E9E9E9
| 83143 ||  || — || August 25, 2001 || Socorro || LINEAR || — || align=right | 2.7 km || 
|-id=144 bgcolor=#E9E9E9
| 83144 ||  || — || August 25, 2001 || Anderson Mesa || LONEOS || EUN || align=right | 2.8 km || 
|-id=145 bgcolor=#d6d6d6
| 83145 ||  || — || August 26, 2001 || Anderson Mesa || LONEOS || URS || align=right | 9.8 km || 
|-id=146 bgcolor=#d6d6d6
| 83146 ||  || — || August 26, 2001 || Desert Eagle || W. K. Y. Yeung || LIX || align=right | 8.9 km || 
|-id=147 bgcolor=#d6d6d6
| 83147 ||  || — || August 26, 2001 || Desert Eagle || W. K. Y. Yeung || — || align=right | 6.2 km || 
|-id=148 bgcolor=#d6d6d6
| 83148 ||  || — || August 26, 2001 || Desert Eagle || W. K. Y. Yeung || — || align=right | 3.9 km || 
|-id=149 bgcolor=#d6d6d6
| 83149 ||  || — || August 20, 2001 || Socorro || LINEAR || VER || align=right | 5.9 km || 
|-id=150 bgcolor=#d6d6d6
| 83150 ||  || — || August 20, 2001 || Socorro || LINEAR || — || align=right | 8.6 km || 
|-id=151 bgcolor=#d6d6d6
| 83151 ||  || — || August 20, 2001 || Socorro || LINEAR || — || align=right | 4.5 km || 
|-id=152 bgcolor=#E9E9E9
| 83152 ||  || — || August 20, 2001 || Palomar || NEAT || — || align=right | 8.2 km || 
|-id=153 bgcolor=#d6d6d6
| 83153 ||  || — || August 20, 2001 || Haleakala || NEAT || EOS || align=right | 5.9 km || 
|-id=154 bgcolor=#d6d6d6
| 83154 ||  || — || August 19, 2001 || Socorro || LINEAR || — || align=right | 5.8 km || 
|-id=155 bgcolor=#d6d6d6
| 83155 ||  || — || August 19, 2001 || Socorro || LINEAR || — || align=right | 8.0 km || 
|-id=156 bgcolor=#E9E9E9
| 83156 ||  || — || August 19, 2001 || Socorro || LINEAR || EUN || align=right | 3.0 km || 
|-id=157 bgcolor=#E9E9E9
| 83157 ||  || — || August 19, 2001 || Socorro || LINEAR || WIT || align=right | 2.4 km || 
|-id=158 bgcolor=#d6d6d6
| 83158 ||  || — || August 19, 2001 || Socorro || LINEAR || — || align=right | 6.2 km || 
|-id=159 bgcolor=#E9E9E9
| 83159 ||  || — || August 19, 2001 || Socorro || LINEAR || — || align=right | 4.0 km || 
|-id=160 bgcolor=#d6d6d6
| 83160 ||  || — || August 19, 2001 || Socorro || LINEAR || — || align=right | 6.7 km || 
|-id=161 bgcolor=#E9E9E9
| 83161 ||  || — || August 19, 2001 || Socorro || LINEAR || — || align=right | 3.3 km || 
|-id=162 bgcolor=#d6d6d6
| 83162 ||  || — || August 19, 2001 || Socorro || LINEAR || — || align=right | 6.5 km || 
|-id=163 bgcolor=#d6d6d6
| 83163 ||  || — || August 19, 2001 || Socorro || LINEAR || EOS || align=right | 4.4 km || 
|-id=164 bgcolor=#d6d6d6
| 83164 ||  || — || August 19, 2001 || Socorro || LINEAR || — || align=right | 7.4 km || 
|-id=165 bgcolor=#d6d6d6
| 83165 ||  || — || August 19, 2001 || Socorro || LINEAR || — || align=right | 6.0 km || 
|-id=166 bgcolor=#fefefe
| 83166 ||  || — || August 19, 2001 || Socorro || LINEAR || — || align=right | 1.5 km || 
|-id=167 bgcolor=#d6d6d6
| 83167 ||  || — || August 19, 2001 || Socorro || LINEAR || — || align=right | 6.4 km || 
|-id=168 bgcolor=#d6d6d6
| 83168 ||  || — || August 19, 2001 || Socorro || LINEAR || — || align=right | 3.8 km || 
|-id=169 bgcolor=#d6d6d6
| 83169 ||  || — || August 19, 2001 || Socorro || LINEAR || — || align=right | 9.8 km || 
|-id=170 bgcolor=#d6d6d6
| 83170 ||  || — || August 19, 2001 || Anderson Mesa || LONEOS || ALA || align=right | 10 km || 
|-id=171 bgcolor=#d6d6d6
| 83171 ||  || — || August 18, 2001 || Socorro || LINEAR || — || align=right | 4.0 km || 
|-id=172 bgcolor=#d6d6d6
| 83172 ||  || — || August 18, 2001 || Palomar || NEAT || — || align=right | 6.7 km || 
|-id=173 bgcolor=#E9E9E9
| 83173 ||  || — || August 30, 2001 || Palomar || NEAT || VIB || align=right | 4.3 km || 
|-id=174 bgcolor=#d6d6d6
| 83174 ||  || — || August 23, 2001 || Haleakala || NEAT || EOS || align=right | 5.1 km || 
|-id=175 bgcolor=#d6d6d6
| 83175 ||  || — || August 23, 2001 || Haleakala || NEAT || URS || align=right | 7.8 km || 
|-id=176 bgcolor=#d6d6d6
| 83176 ||  || — || August 17, 2001 || Palomar || NEAT || — || align=right | 7.6 km || 
|-id=177 bgcolor=#d6d6d6
| 83177 ||  || — || August 17, 2001 || Socorro || LINEAR || — || align=right | 6.8 km || 
|-id=178 bgcolor=#fefefe
| 83178 ||  || — || August 17, 2001 || Socorro || LINEAR || — || align=right | 1.9 km || 
|-id=179 bgcolor=#E9E9E9
| 83179 ||  || — || August 17, 2001 || Socorro || LINEAR || — || align=right | 2.2 km || 
|-id=180 bgcolor=#E9E9E9
| 83180 ||  || — || August 17, 2001 || Socorro || LINEAR || HOF || align=right | 5.3 km || 
|-id=181 bgcolor=#d6d6d6
| 83181 ||  || — || August 16, 2001 || Socorro || LINEAR || KOR || align=right | 3.1 km || 
|-id=182 bgcolor=#fefefe
| 83182 ||  || — || August 16, 2001 || Socorro || LINEAR || — || align=right | 1.4 km || 
|-id=183 bgcolor=#d6d6d6
| 83183 ||  || — || August 16, 2001 || Palomar || NEAT || — || align=right | 9.7 km || 
|-id=184 bgcolor=#d6d6d6
| 83184 ||  || — || August 16, 2001 || Palomar || NEAT || — || align=right | 4.6 km || 
|-id=185 bgcolor=#E9E9E9
| 83185 ||  || — || August 24, 2001 || Socorro || LINEAR || — || align=right | 2.6 km || 
|-id=186 bgcolor=#E9E9E9
| 83186 ||  || — || August 24, 2001 || Socorro || LINEAR || — || align=right | 3.4 km || 
|-id=187 bgcolor=#E9E9E9
| 83187 ||  || — || August 24, 2001 || Socorro || LINEAR || MRX || align=right | 2.7 km || 
|-id=188 bgcolor=#E9E9E9
| 83188 ||  || — || August 24, 2001 || Anderson Mesa || LONEOS || — || align=right | 8.2 km || 
|-id=189 bgcolor=#E9E9E9
| 83189 ||  || — || August 24, 2001 || Socorro || LINEAR || EUN || align=right | 2.8 km || 
|-id=190 bgcolor=#d6d6d6
| 83190 ||  || — || August 27, 2001 || Anderson Mesa || LONEOS || EOS || align=right | 4.5 km || 
|-id=191 bgcolor=#d6d6d6
| 83191 ||  || — || August 16, 2001 || Socorro || LINEAR || — || align=right | 5.1 km || 
|-id=192 bgcolor=#E9E9E9
| 83192 ||  || — || August 19, 2001 || Socorro || LINEAR || PAD || align=right | 4.9 km || 
|-id=193 bgcolor=#d6d6d6
| 83193 ||  || — || August 25, 2001 || Socorro || LINEAR || — || align=right | 5.5 km || 
|-id=194 bgcolor=#E9E9E9
| 83194 ||  || — || August 25, 2001 || Anderson Mesa || LONEOS || GEF || align=right | 3.0 km || 
|-id=195 bgcolor=#d6d6d6
| 83195 ||  || — || September 7, 2001 || Socorro || LINEAR || THM || align=right | 6.1 km || 
|-id=196 bgcolor=#d6d6d6
| 83196 ||  || — || September 7, 2001 || Socorro || LINEAR || — || align=right | 4.9 km || 
|-id=197 bgcolor=#E9E9E9
| 83197 ||  || — || September 7, 2001 || Socorro || LINEAR || — || align=right | 2.2 km || 
|-id=198 bgcolor=#E9E9E9
| 83198 ||  || — || September 8, 2001 || Socorro || LINEAR || — || align=right | 3.7 km || 
|-id=199 bgcolor=#E9E9E9
| 83199 ||  || — || September 8, 2001 || Socorro || LINEAR || — || align=right | 2.4 km || 
|-id=200 bgcolor=#E9E9E9
| 83200 ||  || — || September 10, 2001 || Desert Eagle || W. K. Y. Yeung || — || align=right | 3.2 km || 
|}

83201–83300 

|-bgcolor=#d6d6d6
| 83201 ||  || — || September 10, 2001 || Desert Eagle || W. K. Y. Yeung || THM || align=right | 7.4 km || 
|-id=202 bgcolor=#E9E9E9
| 83202 ||  || — || September 8, 2001 || Socorro || LINEAR || HEN || align=right | 2.1 km || 
|-id=203 bgcolor=#E9E9E9
| 83203 ||  || — || September 10, 2001 || Desert Eagle || W. K. Y. Yeung || — || align=right | 2.5 km || 
|-id=204 bgcolor=#d6d6d6
| 83204 ||  || — || September 7, 2001 || Socorro || LINEAR || HYG || align=right | 5.7 km || 
|-id=205 bgcolor=#E9E9E9
| 83205 ||  || — || September 8, 2001 || Socorro || LINEAR || EUN || align=right | 2.3 km || 
|-id=206 bgcolor=#d6d6d6
| 83206 ||  || — || September 9, 2001 || Socorro || LINEAR || URS || align=right | 11 km || 
|-id=207 bgcolor=#d6d6d6
| 83207 ||  || — || September 10, 2001 || Socorro || LINEAR || — || align=right | 3.6 km || 
|-id=208 bgcolor=#E9E9E9
| 83208 ||  || — || September 10, 2001 || Socorro || LINEAR || — || align=right | 5.1 km || 
|-id=209 bgcolor=#d6d6d6
| 83209 ||  || — || September 11, 2001 || Desert Eagle || W. K. Y. Yeung || — || align=right | 7.3 km || 
|-id=210 bgcolor=#E9E9E9
| 83210 ||  || — || September 7, 2001 || Socorro || LINEAR || — || align=right | 5.5 km || 
|-id=211 bgcolor=#E9E9E9
| 83211 ||  || — || September 7, 2001 || Socorro || LINEAR || — || align=right | 2.9 km || 
|-id=212 bgcolor=#d6d6d6
| 83212 ||  || — || September 7, 2001 || Socorro || LINEAR || URS || align=right | 6.2 km || 
|-id=213 bgcolor=#d6d6d6
| 83213 ||  || — || September 7, 2001 || Socorro || LINEAR || — || align=right | 5.9 km || 
|-id=214 bgcolor=#E9E9E9
| 83214 ||  || — || September 7, 2001 || Socorro || LINEAR || — || align=right | 3.5 km || 
|-id=215 bgcolor=#E9E9E9
| 83215 ||  || — || September 7, 2001 || Socorro || LINEAR || GEF || align=right | 2.9 km || 
|-id=216 bgcolor=#d6d6d6
| 83216 ||  || — || September 7, 2001 || Socorro || LINEAR || CHA || align=right | 4.3 km || 
|-id=217 bgcolor=#d6d6d6
| 83217 ||  || — || September 7, 2001 || Socorro || LINEAR || — || align=right | 5.6 km || 
|-id=218 bgcolor=#d6d6d6
| 83218 ||  || — || September 7, 2001 || Socorro || LINEAR || slow || align=right | 8.1 km || 
|-id=219 bgcolor=#E9E9E9
| 83219 ||  || — || September 7, 2001 || Socorro || LINEAR || HEN || align=right | 1.8 km || 
|-id=220 bgcolor=#E9E9E9
| 83220 ||  || — || September 7, 2001 || Socorro || LINEAR || — || align=right | 4.1 km || 
|-id=221 bgcolor=#d6d6d6
| 83221 ||  || — || September 7, 2001 || Socorro || LINEAR || — || align=right | 5.6 km || 
|-id=222 bgcolor=#E9E9E9
| 83222 ||  || — || September 8, 2001 || Socorro || LINEAR || DOR || align=right | 8.6 km || 
|-id=223 bgcolor=#d6d6d6
| 83223 ||  || — || September 8, 2001 || Socorro || LINEAR || — || align=right | 7.8 km || 
|-id=224 bgcolor=#d6d6d6
| 83224 ||  || — || September 8, 2001 || Socorro || LINEAR || — || align=right | 3.9 km || 
|-id=225 bgcolor=#d6d6d6
| 83225 ||  || — || September 8, 2001 || Socorro || LINEAR || — || align=right | 4.1 km || 
|-id=226 bgcolor=#E9E9E9
| 83226 ||  || — || September 8, 2001 || Socorro || LINEAR || DOR || align=right | 7.0 km || 
|-id=227 bgcolor=#E9E9E9
| 83227 ||  || — || September 8, 2001 || Socorro || LINEAR || MAR || align=right | 2.5 km || 
|-id=228 bgcolor=#d6d6d6
| 83228 ||  || — || September 8, 2001 || Socorro || LINEAR || — || align=right | 6.8 km || 
|-id=229 bgcolor=#d6d6d6
| 83229 ||  || — || September 8, 2001 || Socorro || LINEAR || EOS || align=right | 4.8 km || 
|-id=230 bgcolor=#d6d6d6
| 83230 ||  || — || September 8, 2001 || Socorro || LINEAR || — || align=right | 5.2 km || 
|-id=231 bgcolor=#E9E9E9
| 83231 ||  || — || September 8, 2001 || Socorro || LINEAR || — || align=right | 1.8 km || 
|-id=232 bgcolor=#d6d6d6
| 83232 ||  || — || September 11, 2001 || Socorro || LINEAR || — || align=right | 5.7 km || 
|-id=233 bgcolor=#d6d6d6
| 83233 ||  || — || September 11, 2001 || Socorro || LINEAR || — || align=right | 5.6 km || 
|-id=234 bgcolor=#d6d6d6
| 83234 ||  || — || September 9, 2001 || Palomar || NEAT || — || align=right | 7.9 km || 
|-id=235 bgcolor=#d6d6d6
| 83235 ||  || — || September 9, 2001 || Palomar || NEAT || KOR || align=right | 3.3 km || 
|-id=236 bgcolor=#E9E9E9
| 83236 ||  || — || September 9, 2001 || Palomar || NEAT || — || align=right | 3.6 km || 
|-id=237 bgcolor=#E9E9E9
| 83237 ||  || — || September 14, 2001 || Palomar || NEAT || — || align=right | 2.9 km || 
|-id=238 bgcolor=#d6d6d6
| 83238 ||  || — || September 9, 2001 || Goodricke-Pigott || R. A. Tucker || TEL || align=right | 4.2 km || 
|-id=239 bgcolor=#fefefe
| 83239 ||  || — || September 11, 2001 || Socorro || LINEAR || — || align=right | 3.8 km || 
|-id=240 bgcolor=#d6d6d6
| 83240 ||  || — || September 12, 2001 || Socorro || LINEAR || — || align=right | 5.3 km || 
|-id=241 bgcolor=#d6d6d6
| 83241 ||  || — || September 12, 2001 || Socorro || LINEAR || EOS || align=right | 4.0 km || 
|-id=242 bgcolor=#d6d6d6
| 83242 ||  || — || September 12, 2001 || Socorro || LINEAR || — || align=right | 5.1 km || 
|-id=243 bgcolor=#d6d6d6
| 83243 ||  || — || September 12, 2001 || Socorro || LINEAR || — || align=right | 6.3 km || 
|-id=244 bgcolor=#d6d6d6
| 83244 ||  || — || September 12, 2001 || Socorro || LINEAR || EOS || align=right | 7.9 km || 
|-id=245 bgcolor=#fefefe
| 83245 ||  || — || September 12, 2001 || Socorro || LINEAR || NYS || align=right | 1.7 km || 
|-id=246 bgcolor=#d6d6d6
| 83246 ||  || — || September 12, 2001 || Socorro || LINEAR || THM || align=right | 6.6 km || 
|-id=247 bgcolor=#d6d6d6
| 83247 ||  || — || September 12, 2001 || Socorro || LINEAR || — || align=right | 4.9 km || 
|-id=248 bgcolor=#E9E9E9
| 83248 ||  || — || September 12, 2001 || Socorro || LINEAR || — || align=right | 3.7 km || 
|-id=249 bgcolor=#E9E9E9
| 83249 ||  || — || September 12, 2001 || Socorro || LINEAR || WIT || align=right | 2.3 km || 
|-id=250 bgcolor=#d6d6d6
| 83250 ||  || — || September 12, 2001 || Socorro || LINEAR || — || align=right | 5.1 km || 
|-id=251 bgcolor=#E9E9E9
| 83251 ||  || — || September 10, 2001 || Socorro || LINEAR || PAE || align=right | 4.7 km || 
|-id=252 bgcolor=#d6d6d6
| 83252 ||  || — || September 10, 2001 || Socorro || LINEAR || EOS || align=right | 6.4 km || 
|-id=253 bgcolor=#d6d6d6
| 83253 ||  || — || September 10, 2001 || Socorro || LINEAR || VER || align=right | 6.3 km || 
|-id=254 bgcolor=#d6d6d6
| 83254 ||  || — || September 10, 2001 || Socorro || LINEAR || — || align=right | 9.2 km || 
|-id=255 bgcolor=#E9E9E9
| 83255 ||  || — || September 10, 2001 || Socorro || LINEAR || — || align=right | 2.7 km || 
|-id=256 bgcolor=#d6d6d6
| 83256 ||  || — || September 10, 2001 || Socorro || LINEAR || EOS || align=right | 4.6 km || 
|-id=257 bgcolor=#d6d6d6
| 83257 ||  || — || September 10, 2001 || Socorro || LINEAR || — || align=right | 8.9 km || 
|-id=258 bgcolor=#E9E9E9
| 83258 ||  || — || September 10, 2001 || Socorro || LINEAR || — || align=right | 3.0 km || 
|-id=259 bgcolor=#d6d6d6
| 83259 ||  || — || September 10, 2001 || Socorro || LINEAR || EOS || align=right | 4.1 km || 
|-id=260 bgcolor=#E9E9E9
| 83260 ||  || — || September 10, 2001 || Socorro || LINEAR || — || align=right | 4.9 km || 
|-id=261 bgcolor=#E9E9E9
| 83261 ||  || — || September 10, 2001 || Socorro || LINEAR || — || align=right | 4.0 km || 
|-id=262 bgcolor=#E9E9E9
| 83262 ||  || — || September 10, 2001 || Socorro || LINEAR || MAR || align=right | 3.0 km || 
|-id=263 bgcolor=#E9E9E9
| 83263 ||  || — || September 10, 2001 || Socorro || LINEAR || PAD || align=right | 5.0 km || 
|-id=264 bgcolor=#E9E9E9
| 83264 ||  || — || September 10, 2001 || Socorro || LINEAR || — || align=right | 9.9 km || 
|-id=265 bgcolor=#d6d6d6
| 83265 ||  || — || September 10, 2001 || Socorro || LINEAR || — || align=right | 4.7 km || 
|-id=266 bgcolor=#E9E9E9
| 83266 ||  || — || September 10, 2001 || Socorro || LINEAR || — || align=right | 4.1 km || 
|-id=267 bgcolor=#d6d6d6
| 83267 ||  || — || September 10, 2001 || Socorro || LINEAR || KOR || align=right | 3.0 km || 
|-id=268 bgcolor=#d6d6d6
| 83268 ||  || — || September 10, 2001 || Socorro || LINEAR || — || align=right | 6.0 km || 
|-id=269 bgcolor=#d6d6d6
| 83269 ||  || — || September 10, 2001 || Socorro || LINEAR || — || align=right | 5.9 km || 
|-id=270 bgcolor=#fefefe
| 83270 ||  || — || September 10, 2001 || Socorro || LINEAR || — || align=right | 1.9 km || 
|-id=271 bgcolor=#E9E9E9
| 83271 ||  || — || September 10, 2001 || Socorro || LINEAR || — || align=right | 3.1 km || 
|-id=272 bgcolor=#d6d6d6
| 83272 ||  || — || September 14, 2001 || Palomar || NEAT || — || align=right | 7.7 km || 
|-id=273 bgcolor=#E9E9E9
| 83273 ||  || — || September 13, 2001 || Palomar || NEAT || DOR || align=right | 7.1 km || 
|-id=274 bgcolor=#E9E9E9
| 83274 ||  || — || September 14, 2001 || Palomar || NEAT || — || align=right | 2.0 km || 
|-id=275 bgcolor=#d6d6d6
| 83275 ||  || — || September 14, 2001 || Palomar || NEAT || — || align=right | 5.6 km || 
|-id=276 bgcolor=#d6d6d6
| 83276 ||  || — || September 11, 2001 || Anderson Mesa || LONEOS || EOS || align=right | 4.8 km || 
|-id=277 bgcolor=#E9E9E9
| 83277 ||  || — || September 11, 2001 || Anderson Mesa || LONEOS || — || align=right | 3.6 km || 
|-id=278 bgcolor=#E9E9E9
| 83278 ||  || — || September 11, 2001 || Anderson Mesa || LONEOS || — || align=right | 5.0 km || 
|-id=279 bgcolor=#E9E9E9
| 83279 ||  || — || September 11, 2001 || Anderson Mesa || LONEOS || — || align=right | 2.5 km || 
|-id=280 bgcolor=#fefefe
| 83280 ||  || — || September 11, 2001 || Anderson Mesa || LONEOS || MAS || align=right | 1.5 km || 
|-id=281 bgcolor=#d6d6d6
| 83281 ||  || — || September 11, 2001 || Anderson Mesa || LONEOS || EOS || align=right | 5.5 km || 
|-id=282 bgcolor=#d6d6d6
| 83282 ||  || — || September 11, 2001 || Anderson Mesa || LONEOS || — || align=right | 6.1 km || 
|-id=283 bgcolor=#E9E9E9
| 83283 ||  || — || September 11, 2001 || Anderson Mesa || LONEOS || — || align=right | 2.2 km || 
|-id=284 bgcolor=#d6d6d6
| 83284 ||  || — || September 11, 2001 || Anderson Mesa || LONEOS || EOS || align=right | 5.6 km || 
|-id=285 bgcolor=#E9E9E9
| 83285 ||  || — || September 11, 2001 || Anderson Mesa || LONEOS || AGN || align=right | 3.0 km || 
|-id=286 bgcolor=#E9E9E9
| 83286 ||  || — || September 11, 2001 || Anderson Mesa || LONEOS || — || align=right | 2.9 km || 
|-id=287 bgcolor=#d6d6d6
| 83287 ||  || — || September 11, 2001 || Anderson Mesa || LONEOS || — || align=right | 3.6 km || 
|-id=288 bgcolor=#d6d6d6
| 83288 ||  || — || September 11, 2001 || Anderson Mesa || LONEOS || HYG || align=right | 7.7 km || 
|-id=289 bgcolor=#d6d6d6
| 83289 ||  || — || September 11, 2001 || Anderson Mesa || LONEOS || — || align=right | 7.4 km || 
|-id=290 bgcolor=#E9E9E9
| 83290 ||  || — || September 11, 2001 || Anderson Mesa || LONEOS || — || align=right | 4.7 km || 
|-id=291 bgcolor=#E9E9E9
| 83291 ||  || — || September 11, 2001 || Anderson Mesa || LONEOS || — || align=right | 2.4 km || 
|-id=292 bgcolor=#d6d6d6
| 83292 ||  || — || September 11, 2001 || Anderson Mesa || LONEOS || — || align=right | 8.4 km || 
|-id=293 bgcolor=#d6d6d6
| 83293 ||  || — || September 11, 2001 || Anderson Mesa || LONEOS || — || align=right | 5.9 km || 
|-id=294 bgcolor=#d6d6d6
| 83294 ||  || — || September 12, 2001 || Socorro || LINEAR || EOS || align=right | 4.4 km || 
|-id=295 bgcolor=#fefefe
| 83295 ||  || — || September 12, 2001 || Socorro || LINEAR || — || align=right | 1.6 km || 
|-id=296 bgcolor=#E9E9E9
| 83296 ||  || — || September 12, 2001 || Socorro || LINEAR || PAD || align=right | 2.8 km || 
|-id=297 bgcolor=#d6d6d6
| 83297 ||  || — || September 12, 2001 || Socorro || LINEAR || THM || align=right | 6.4 km || 
|-id=298 bgcolor=#E9E9E9
| 83298 ||  || — || September 12, 2001 || Socorro || LINEAR || — || align=right | 3.1 km || 
|-id=299 bgcolor=#d6d6d6
| 83299 ||  || — || September 12, 2001 || Socorro || LINEAR || — || align=right | 4.7 km || 
|-id=300 bgcolor=#E9E9E9
| 83300 ||  || — || September 12, 2001 || Socorro || LINEAR || — || align=right | 5.2 km || 
|}

83301–83400 

|-bgcolor=#fefefe
| 83301 ||  || — || September 12, 2001 || Socorro || LINEAR || NYS || align=right | 1.5 km || 
|-id=302 bgcolor=#d6d6d6
| 83302 ||  || — || September 12, 2001 || Socorro || LINEAR || — || align=right | 5.3 km || 
|-id=303 bgcolor=#fefefe
| 83303 ||  || — || September 12, 2001 || Socorro || LINEAR || NYS || align=right | 1.4 km || 
|-id=304 bgcolor=#d6d6d6
| 83304 ||  || — || September 12, 2001 || Socorro || LINEAR || — || align=right | 5.5 km || 
|-id=305 bgcolor=#d6d6d6
| 83305 ||  || — || September 12, 2001 || Socorro || LINEAR || — || align=right | 5.1 km || 
|-id=306 bgcolor=#E9E9E9
| 83306 ||  || — || September 12, 2001 || Socorro || LINEAR || — || align=right | 2.8 km || 
|-id=307 bgcolor=#d6d6d6
| 83307 ||  || — || September 12, 2001 || Socorro || LINEAR || — || align=right | 6.3 km || 
|-id=308 bgcolor=#E9E9E9
| 83308 ||  || — || September 12, 2001 || Socorro || LINEAR || — || align=right | 4.8 km || 
|-id=309 bgcolor=#E9E9E9
| 83309 ||  || — || September 12, 2001 || Socorro || LINEAR || WIT || align=right | 2.0 km || 
|-id=310 bgcolor=#d6d6d6
| 83310 ||  || — || September 12, 2001 || Socorro || LINEAR || — || align=right | 5.6 km || 
|-id=311 bgcolor=#d6d6d6
| 83311 ||  || — || September 12, 2001 || Socorro || LINEAR || — || align=right | 5.5 km || 
|-id=312 bgcolor=#d6d6d6
| 83312 ||  || — || September 12, 2001 || Socorro || LINEAR || HYG || align=right | 6.6 km || 
|-id=313 bgcolor=#d6d6d6
| 83313 ||  || — || September 12, 2001 || Socorro || LINEAR || KOR || align=right | 3.5 km || 
|-id=314 bgcolor=#d6d6d6
| 83314 ||  || — || September 12, 2001 || Socorro || LINEAR || — || align=right | 5.9 km || 
|-id=315 bgcolor=#d6d6d6
| 83315 ||  || — || September 12, 2001 || Socorro || LINEAR || VER || align=right | 6.7 km || 
|-id=316 bgcolor=#E9E9E9
| 83316 ||  || — || September 12, 2001 || Socorro || LINEAR || — || align=right | 2.8 km || 
|-id=317 bgcolor=#d6d6d6
| 83317 ||  || — || September 12, 2001 || Socorro || LINEAR || — || align=right | 4.3 km || 
|-id=318 bgcolor=#d6d6d6
| 83318 ||  || — || September 12, 2001 || Socorro || LINEAR || — || align=right | 6.3 km || 
|-id=319 bgcolor=#d6d6d6
| 83319 ||  || — || September 12, 2001 || Socorro || LINEAR || EOS || align=right | 4.0 km || 
|-id=320 bgcolor=#d6d6d6
| 83320 ||  || — || September 12, 2001 || Socorro || LINEAR || KOR || align=right | 2.5 km || 
|-id=321 bgcolor=#d6d6d6
| 83321 ||  || — || September 12, 2001 || Socorro || LINEAR || EMA || align=right | 5.9 km || 
|-id=322 bgcolor=#d6d6d6
| 83322 ||  || — || September 12, 2001 || Socorro || LINEAR || KOR || align=right | 3.0 km || 
|-id=323 bgcolor=#d6d6d6
| 83323 ||  || — || September 12, 2001 || Socorro || LINEAR || — || align=right | 4.9 km || 
|-id=324 bgcolor=#E9E9E9
| 83324 ||  || — || September 12, 2001 || Socorro || LINEAR || — || align=right | 4.4 km || 
|-id=325 bgcolor=#d6d6d6
| 83325 ||  || — || September 12, 2001 || Socorro || LINEAR || — || align=right | 5.5 km || 
|-id=326 bgcolor=#E9E9E9
| 83326 ||  || — || September 12, 2001 || Socorro || LINEAR || — || align=right | 4.3 km || 
|-id=327 bgcolor=#d6d6d6
| 83327 ||  || — || September 12, 2001 || Socorro || LINEAR || KOR || align=right | 3.2 km || 
|-id=328 bgcolor=#d6d6d6
| 83328 ||  || — || September 12, 2001 || Socorro || LINEAR || — || align=right | 6.3 km || 
|-id=329 bgcolor=#E9E9E9
| 83329 ||  || — || September 12, 2001 || Socorro || LINEAR || — || align=right | 5.9 km || 
|-id=330 bgcolor=#d6d6d6
| 83330 ||  || — || September 12, 2001 || Socorro || LINEAR || — || align=right | 5.7 km || 
|-id=331 bgcolor=#d6d6d6
| 83331 ||  || — || September 12, 2001 || Socorro || LINEAR || — || align=right | 7.2 km || 
|-id=332 bgcolor=#d6d6d6
| 83332 ||  || — || September 12, 2001 || Socorro || LINEAR || — || align=right | 6.4 km || 
|-id=333 bgcolor=#E9E9E9
| 83333 ||  || — || September 12, 2001 || Socorro || LINEAR || — || align=right | 2.5 km || 
|-id=334 bgcolor=#E9E9E9
| 83334 ||  || — || September 12, 2001 || Socorro || LINEAR || — || align=right | 2.0 km || 
|-id=335 bgcolor=#d6d6d6
| 83335 ||  || — || September 12, 2001 || Socorro || LINEAR || HYG || align=right | 5.3 km || 
|-id=336 bgcolor=#E9E9E9
| 83336 ||  || — || September 12, 2001 || Socorro || LINEAR || — || align=right | 3.1 km || 
|-id=337 bgcolor=#d6d6d6
| 83337 ||  || — || September 12, 2001 || Socorro || LINEAR || — || align=right | 6.2 km || 
|-id=338 bgcolor=#d6d6d6
| 83338 ||  || — || September 12, 2001 || Socorro || LINEAR || EOS || align=right | 3.8 km || 
|-id=339 bgcolor=#fefefe
| 83339 ||  || — || September 12, 2001 || Socorro || LINEAR || — || align=right | 2.1 km || 
|-id=340 bgcolor=#E9E9E9
| 83340 ||  || — || September 12, 2001 || Socorro || LINEAR || — || align=right | 4.9 km || 
|-id=341 bgcolor=#E9E9E9
| 83341 ||  || — || September 12, 2001 || Socorro || LINEAR || AGN || align=right | 2.9 km || 
|-id=342 bgcolor=#d6d6d6
| 83342 ||  || — || September 12, 2001 || Socorro || LINEAR || — || align=right | 6.3 km || 
|-id=343 bgcolor=#d6d6d6
| 83343 ||  || — || September 12, 2001 || Socorro || LINEAR || EOS || align=right | 3.8 km || 
|-id=344 bgcolor=#d6d6d6
| 83344 ||  || — || September 12, 2001 || Socorro || LINEAR || — || align=right | 5.8 km || 
|-id=345 bgcolor=#d6d6d6
| 83345 ||  || — || September 12, 2001 || Socorro || LINEAR || 7:4 || align=right | 9.1 km || 
|-id=346 bgcolor=#E9E9E9
| 83346 ||  || — || September 12, 2001 || Socorro || LINEAR || NEM || align=right | 5.1 km || 
|-id=347 bgcolor=#d6d6d6
| 83347 ||  || — || September 12, 2001 || Socorro || LINEAR || — || align=right | 5.2 km || 
|-id=348 bgcolor=#d6d6d6
| 83348 ||  || — || September 8, 2001 || Socorro || LINEAR || — || align=right | 6.5 km || 
|-id=349 bgcolor=#E9E9E9
| 83349 ||  || — || September 9, 2001 || Socorro || LINEAR || MAR || align=right | 2.9 km || 
|-id=350 bgcolor=#d6d6d6
| 83350 ||  || — || September 9, 2001 || Palomar || NEAT || EOS || align=right | 3.5 km || 
|-id=351 bgcolor=#E9E9E9
| 83351 ||  || — || September 9, 2001 || Anderson Mesa || LONEOS || — || align=right | 2.6 km || 
|-id=352 bgcolor=#E9E9E9
| 83352 ||  || — || September 10, 2001 || Anderson Mesa || LONEOS || — || align=right | 2.2 km || 
|-id=353 bgcolor=#d6d6d6
| 83353 ||  || — || September 11, 2001 || Anderson Mesa || LONEOS || EOS || align=right | 4.3 km || 
|-id=354 bgcolor=#d6d6d6
| 83354 ||  || — || September 11, 2001 || Anderson Mesa || LONEOS || — || align=right | 6.4 km || 
|-id=355 bgcolor=#d6d6d6
| 83355 ||  || — || September 11, 2001 || Anderson Mesa || LONEOS || EOS || align=right | 4.8 km || 
|-id=356 bgcolor=#E9E9E9
| 83356 ||  || — || September 12, 2001 || Socorro || LINEAR || — || align=right | 5.2 km || 
|-id=357 bgcolor=#d6d6d6
| 83357 ||  || — || September 12, 2001 || Socorro || LINEAR || — || align=right | 5.7 km || 
|-id=358 bgcolor=#E9E9E9
| 83358 ||  || — || September 4, 2001 || Palomar || NEAT || — || align=right | 3.6 km || 
|-id=359 bgcolor=#d6d6d6
| 83359 ||  || — || September 12, 2001 || Socorro || LINEAR || — || align=right | 6.6 km || 
|-id=360 bgcolor=#E9E9E9
| 83360 Catalina || 2001 SH ||  || September 16, 2001 || Fountain Hills || C. W. Juels, P. R. Holvorcem || ADE || align=right | 5.8 km || 
|-id=361 bgcolor=#d6d6d6
| 83361 || 2001 SK || — || September 16, 2001 || Fountain Hills || C. W. Juels, P. R. Holvorcem || — || align=right | 8.6 km || 
|-id=362 bgcolor=#d6d6d6
| 83362 Sandukruit ||  ||  || September 17, 2001 || Desert Eagle || W. K. Y. Yeung || ALA || align=right | 7.7 km || 
|-id=363 bgcolor=#E9E9E9
| 83363 Yamwingwah ||  ||  || September 17, 2001 || Desert Eagle || W. K. Y. Yeung || — || align=right | 5.5 km || 
|-id=364 bgcolor=#d6d6d6
| 83364 ||  || — || September 17, 2001 || Desert Eagle || W. K. Y. Yeung || HYG || align=right | 6.5 km || 
|-id=365 bgcolor=#d6d6d6
| 83365 ||  || — || September 17, 2001 || Desert Eagle || W. K. Y. Yeung || URS || align=right | 4.9 km || 
|-id=366 bgcolor=#d6d6d6
| 83366 ||  || — || September 17, 2001 || Desert Eagle || W. K. Y. Yeung || URS || align=right | 5.9 km || 
|-id=367 bgcolor=#d6d6d6
| 83367 ||  || — || September 17, 2001 || Desert Eagle || W. K. Y. Yeung || KOR || align=right | 3.4 km || 
|-id=368 bgcolor=#E9E9E9
| 83368 ||  || — || September 17, 2001 || Desert Eagle || W. K. Y. Yeung || — || align=right | 3.7 km || 
|-id=369 bgcolor=#d6d6d6
| 83369 ||  || — || September 17, 2001 || Desert Eagle || W. K. Y. Yeung || KOR || align=right | 4.2 km || 
|-id=370 bgcolor=#E9E9E9
| 83370 ||  || — || September 17, 2001 || Goodricke-Pigott || R. A. Tucker || — || align=right | 7.4 km || 
|-id=371 bgcolor=#d6d6d6
| 83371 ||  || — || September 18, 2001 || Goodricke-Pigott || R. A. Tucker || — || align=right | 7.4 km || 
|-id=372 bgcolor=#d6d6d6
| 83372 ||  || — || September 16, 2001 || Socorro || LINEAR || — || align=right | 5.0 km || 
|-id=373 bgcolor=#d6d6d6
| 83373 ||  || — || September 19, 2001 || Fountain Hills || C. W. Juels, P. R. Holvorcem || ALA || align=right | 11 km || 
|-id=374 bgcolor=#d6d6d6
| 83374 ||  || — || September 19, 2001 || Fountain Hills || C. W. Juels, P. R. Holvorcem || slow || align=right | 8.0 km || 
|-id=375 bgcolor=#E9E9E9
| 83375 ||  || — || September 16, 2001 || Socorro || LINEAR || — || align=right | 6.5 km || 
|-id=376 bgcolor=#d6d6d6
| 83376 ||  || — || September 16, 2001 || Socorro || LINEAR || KOR || align=right | 3.0 km || 
|-id=377 bgcolor=#E9E9E9
| 83377 ||  || — || September 16, 2001 || Socorro || LINEAR || HEN || align=right | 2.1 km || 
|-id=378 bgcolor=#d6d6d6
| 83378 ||  || — || September 16, 2001 || Socorro || LINEAR || — || align=right | 5.5 km || 
|-id=379 bgcolor=#d6d6d6
| 83379 ||  || — || September 16, 2001 || Socorro || LINEAR || — || align=right | 3.9 km || 
|-id=380 bgcolor=#E9E9E9
| 83380 ||  || — || September 16, 2001 || Socorro || LINEAR || HOF || align=right | 4.1 km || 
|-id=381 bgcolor=#E9E9E9
| 83381 ||  || — || September 16, 2001 || Socorro || LINEAR || — || align=right | 4.7 km || 
|-id=382 bgcolor=#E9E9E9
| 83382 ||  || — || September 16, 2001 || Socorro || LINEAR || AGN || align=right | 2.5 km || 
|-id=383 bgcolor=#d6d6d6
| 83383 ||  || — || September 16, 2001 || Socorro || LINEAR || — || align=right | 3.7 km || 
|-id=384 bgcolor=#d6d6d6
| 83384 ||  || — || September 16, 2001 || Socorro || LINEAR || — || align=right | 5.6 km || 
|-id=385 bgcolor=#d6d6d6
| 83385 ||  || — || September 16, 2001 || Socorro || LINEAR || KOR || align=right | 4.4 km || 
|-id=386 bgcolor=#fefefe
| 83386 ||  || — || September 16, 2001 || Socorro || LINEAR || MAS || align=right | 1.5 km || 
|-id=387 bgcolor=#d6d6d6
| 83387 ||  || — || September 16, 2001 || Socorro || LINEAR || KOR || align=right | 3.3 km || 
|-id=388 bgcolor=#E9E9E9
| 83388 ||  || — || September 16, 2001 || Socorro || LINEAR || — || align=right | 2.9 km || 
|-id=389 bgcolor=#fefefe
| 83389 ||  || — || September 16, 2001 || Socorro || LINEAR || NYS || align=right | 1.5 km || 
|-id=390 bgcolor=#d6d6d6
| 83390 ||  || — || September 16, 2001 || Socorro || LINEAR || — || align=right | 5.0 km || 
|-id=391 bgcolor=#d6d6d6
| 83391 ||  || — || September 16, 2001 || Socorro || LINEAR || KOR || align=right | 3.3 km || 
|-id=392 bgcolor=#d6d6d6
| 83392 ||  || — || September 16, 2001 || Socorro || LINEAR || KOR || align=right | 2.8 km || 
|-id=393 bgcolor=#E9E9E9
| 83393 ||  || — || September 16, 2001 || Socorro || LINEAR || — || align=right | 3.3 km || 
|-id=394 bgcolor=#d6d6d6
| 83394 ||  || — || September 16, 2001 || Socorro || LINEAR || — || align=right | 6.3 km || 
|-id=395 bgcolor=#d6d6d6
| 83395 ||  || — || September 16, 2001 || Socorro || LINEAR || HYG || align=right | 5.7 km || 
|-id=396 bgcolor=#E9E9E9
| 83396 ||  || — || September 16, 2001 || Socorro || LINEAR || HEN || align=right | 3.0 km || 
|-id=397 bgcolor=#d6d6d6
| 83397 ||  || — || September 16, 2001 || Socorro || LINEAR || — || align=right | 5.7 km || 
|-id=398 bgcolor=#d6d6d6
| 83398 ||  || — || September 16, 2001 || Socorro || LINEAR || — || align=right | 5.7 km || 
|-id=399 bgcolor=#d6d6d6
| 83399 ||  || — || September 16, 2001 || Socorro || LINEAR || TIR || align=right | 6.5 km || 
|-id=400 bgcolor=#E9E9E9
| 83400 ||  || — || September 16, 2001 || Socorro || LINEAR || — || align=right | 2.5 km || 
|}

83401–83500 

|-bgcolor=#d6d6d6
| 83401 ||  || — || September 16, 2001 || Socorro || LINEAR || — || align=right | 5.3 km || 
|-id=402 bgcolor=#d6d6d6
| 83402 ||  || — || September 16, 2001 || Socorro || LINEAR || KOR || align=right | 3.5 km || 
|-id=403 bgcolor=#E9E9E9
| 83403 ||  || — || September 16, 2001 || Socorro || LINEAR || — || align=right | 2.7 km || 
|-id=404 bgcolor=#d6d6d6
| 83404 ||  || — || September 16, 2001 || Socorro || LINEAR || KOR || align=right | 3.8 km || 
|-id=405 bgcolor=#E9E9E9
| 83405 ||  || — || September 16, 2001 || Socorro || LINEAR || WIT || align=right | 2.1 km || 
|-id=406 bgcolor=#d6d6d6
| 83406 ||  || — || September 16, 2001 || Socorro || LINEAR || KOR || align=right | 3.4 km || 
|-id=407 bgcolor=#E9E9E9
| 83407 ||  || — || September 16, 2001 || Socorro || LINEAR || — || align=right | 3.4 km || 
|-id=408 bgcolor=#E9E9E9
| 83408 ||  || — || September 16, 2001 || Socorro || LINEAR || — || align=right | 3.7 km || 
|-id=409 bgcolor=#d6d6d6
| 83409 ||  || — || September 16, 2001 || Socorro || LINEAR || KOR || align=right | 3.6 km || 
|-id=410 bgcolor=#E9E9E9
| 83410 ||  || — || September 16, 2001 || Socorro || LINEAR || GEF || align=right | 3.9 km || 
|-id=411 bgcolor=#d6d6d6
| 83411 ||  || — || September 16, 2001 || Socorro || LINEAR || EOS || align=right | 4.2 km || 
|-id=412 bgcolor=#d6d6d6
| 83412 ||  || — || September 16, 2001 || Socorro || LINEAR || — || align=right | 4.9 km || 
|-id=413 bgcolor=#d6d6d6
| 83413 ||  || — || September 16, 2001 || Socorro || LINEAR || — || align=right | 5.7 km || 
|-id=414 bgcolor=#E9E9E9
| 83414 ||  || — || September 16, 2001 || Socorro || LINEAR || HEN || align=right | 3.1 km || 
|-id=415 bgcolor=#d6d6d6
| 83415 ||  || — || September 16, 2001 || Socorro || LINEAR || — || align=right | 9.5 km || 
|-id=416 bgcolor=#d6d6d6
| 83416 ||  || — || September 16, 2001 || Socorro || LINEAR || — || align=right | 7.3 km || 
|-id=417 bgcolor=#d6d6d6
| 83417 ||  || — || September 16, 2001 || Socorro || LINEAR || — || align=right | 7.8 km || 
|-id=418 bgcolor=#d6d6d6
| 83418 ||  || — || September 16, 2001 || Socorro || LINEAR || KOR || align=right | 2.8 km || 
|-id=419 bgcolor=#E9E9E9
| 83419 ||  || — || September 16, 2001 || Socorro || LINEAR || HEN || align=right | 2.3 km || 
|-id=420 bgcolor=#d6d6d6
| 83420 ||  || — || September 16, 2001 || Socorro || LINEAR || — || align=right | 4.5 km || 
|-id=421 bgcolor=#E9E9E9
| 83421 ||  || — || September 16, 2001 || Socorro || LINEAR || HNA || align=right | 4.4 km || 
|-id=422 bgcolor=#d6d6d6
| 83422 ||  || — || September 16, 2001 || Socorro || LINEAR || KOR || align=right | 3.8 km || 
|-id=423 bgcolor=#d6d6d6
| 83423 ||  || — || September 16, 2001 || Socorro || LINEAR || — || align=right | 4.8 km || 
|-id=424 bgcolor=#fefefe
| 83424 ||  || — || September 16, 2001 || Socorro || LINEAR || — || align=right | 1.9 km || 
|-id=425 bgcolor=#d6d6d6
| 83425 ||  || — || September 16, 2001 || Socorro || LINEAR || THM || align=right | 7.3 km || 
|-id=426 bgcolor=#d6d6d6
| 83426 ||  || — || September 16, 2001 || Socorro || LINEAR || — || align=right | 7.7 km || 
|-id=427 bgcolor=#d6d6d6
| 83427 ||  || — || September 16, 2001 || Socorro || LINEAR || KOR || align=right | 4.5 km || 
|-id=428 bgcolor=#d6d6d6
| 83428 ||  || — || September 16, 2001 || Socorro || LINEAR || — || align=right | 6.3 km || 
|-id=429 bgcolor=#fefefe
| 83429 ||  || — || September 16, 2001 || Socorro || LINEAR || — || align=right | 2.0 km || 
|-id=430 bgcolor=#d6d6d6
| 83430 ||  || — || September 16, 2001 || Socorro || LINEAR || — || align=right | 5.8 km || 
|-id=431 bgcolor=#d6d6d6
| 83431 ||  || — || September 16, 2001 || Socorro || LINEAR || — || align=right | 4.9 km || 
|-id=432 bgcolor=#E9E9E9
| 83432 ||  || — || September 16, 2001 || Socorro || LINEAR || MRX || align=right | 2.7 km || 
|-id=433 bgcolor=#E9E9E9
| 83433 ||  || — || September 16, 2001 || Socorro || LINEAR || — || align=right | 1.8 km || 
|-id=434 bgcolor=#E9E9E9
| 83434 ||  || — || September 16, 2001 || Socorro || LINEAR || — || align=right | 1.9 km || 
|-id=435 bgcolor=#d6d6d6
| 83435 ||  || — || September 16, 2001 || Socorro || LINEAR || — || align=right | 4.9 km || 
|-id=436 bgcolor=#d6d6d6
| 83436 ||  || — || September 16, 2001 || Socorro || LINEAR || EOS || align=right | 5.3 km || 
|-id=437 bgcolor=#d6d6d6
| 83437 ||  || — || September 16, 2001 || Socorro || LINEAR || — || align=right | 8.5 km || 
|-id=438 bgcolor=#E9E9E9
| 83438 ||  || — || September 16, 2001 || Socorro || LINEAR || — || align=right | 2.8 km || 
|-id=439 bgcolor=#d6d6d6
| 83439 ||  || — || September 16, 2001 || Socorro || LINEAR || — || align=right | 8.8 km || 
|-id=440 bgcolor=#E9E9E9
| 83440 ||  || — || September 16, 2001 || Socorro || LINEAR || — || align=right | 4.5 km || 
|-id=441 bgcolor=#d6d6d6
| 83441 ||  || — || September 16, 2001 || Socorro || LINEAR || — || align=right | 4.2 km || 
|-id=442 bgcolor=#d6d6d6
| 83442 ||  || — || September 16, 2001 || Socorro || LINEAR || — || align=right | 5.9 km || 
|-id=443 bgcolor=#d6d6d6
| 83443 ||  || — || September 16, 2001 || Socorro || LINEAR || EOS || align=right | 5.4 km || 
|-id=444 bgcolor=#d6d6d6
| 83444 ||  || — || September 17, 2001 || Socorro || LINEAR || — || align=right | 5.6 km || 
|-id=445 bgcolor=#d6d6d6
| 83445 ||  || — || September 17, 2001 || Socorro || LINEAR || EOS || align=right | 4.7 km || 
|-id=446 bgcolor=#d6d6d6
| 83446 ||  || — || September 17, 2001 || Socorro || LINEAR || — || align=right | 4.8 km || 
|-id=447 bgcolor=#d6d6d6
| 83447 ||  || — || September 17, 2001 || Socorro || LINEAR || EOS || align=right | 5.5 km || 
|-id=448 bgcolor=#d6d6d6
| 83448 ||  || — || September 17, 2001 || Socorro || LINEAR || URS || align=right | 7.0 km || 
|-id=449 bgcolor=#E9E9E9
| 83449 ||  || — || September 17, 2001 || Socorro || LINEAR || WIT || align=right | 2.4 km || 
|-id=450 bgcolor=#d6d6d6
| 83450 ||  || — || September 17, 2001 || Socorro || LINEAR || — || align=right | 5.9 km || 
|-id=451 bgcolor=#d6d6d6
| 83451 ||  || — || September 17, 2001 || Socorro || LINEAR || — || align=right | 8.5 km || 
|-id=452 bgcolor=#d6d6d6
| 83452 ||  || — || September 17, 2001 || Socorro || LINEAR || 7:4 || align=right | 7.3 km || 
|-id=453 bgcolor=#d6d6d6
| 83453 ||  || — || September 17, 2001 || Socorro || LINEAR || — || align=right | 7.2 km || 
|-id=454 bgcolor=#d6d6d6
| 83454 ||  || — || September 17, 2001 || Socorro || LINEAR || — || align=right | 6.8 km || 
|-id=455 bgcolor=#E9E9E9
| 83455 ||  || — || September 17, 2001 || Socorro || LINEAR || — || align=right | 2.7 km || 
|-id=456 bgcolor=#d6d6d6
| 83456 ||  || — || September 17, 2001 || Socorro || LINEAR || — || align=right | 4.7 km || 
|-id=457 bgcolor=#d6d6d6
| 83457 ||  || — || September 17, 2001 || Socorro || LINEAR || — || align=right | 5.3 km || 
|-id=458 bgcolor=#E9E9E9
| 83458 ||  || — || September 17, 2001 || Socorro || LINEAR || — || align=right | 2.1 km || 
|-id=459 bgcolor=#d6d6d6
| 83459 ||  || — || September 17, 2001 || Socorro || LINEAR || — || align=right | 8.3 km || 
|-id=460 bgcolor=#E9E9E9
| 83460 ||  || — || September 17, 2001 || Socorro || LINEAR || — || align=right | 4.0 km || 
|-id=461 bgcolor=#E9E9E9
| 83461 ||  || — || September 17, 2001 || Socorro || LINEAR || — || align=right | 2.9 km || 
|-id=462 bgcolor=#E9E9E9
| 83462 ||  || — || September 17, 2001 || Socorro || LINEAR || EUN || align=right | 2.9 km || 
|-id=463 bgcolor=#E9E9E9
| 83463 ||  || — || September 17, 2001 || Socorro || LINEAR || EUN || align=right | 3.4 km || 
|-id=464 bgcolor=#d6d6d6
| 83464 Irishmccalla ||  ||  || September 19, 2001 || Goodricke-Pigott || R. A. Tucker || — || align=right | 5.6 km || 
|-id=465 bgcolor=#d6d6d6
| 83465 ||  || — || September 19, 2001 || Anderson Mesa || LONEOS || — || align=right | 7.1 km || 
|-id=466 bgcolor=#d6d6d6
| 83466 ||  || — || September 19, 2001 || Anderson Mesa || LONEOS || — || align=right | 4.8 km || 
|-id=467 bgcolor=#d6d6d6
| 83467 ||  || — || September 19, 2001 || Anderson Mesa || LONEOS || CHA || align=right | 5.0 km || 
|-id=468 bgcolor=#d6d6d6
| 83468 ||  || — || September 19, 2001 || Anderson Mesa || LONEOS || EOS || align=right | 4.9 km || 
|-id=469 bgcolor=#E9E9E9
| 83469 ||  || — || September 19, 2001 || Anderson Mesa || LONEOS || — || align=right | 5.1 km || 
|-id=470 bgcolor=#E9E9E9
| 83470 ||  || — || September 16, 2001 || Socorro || LINEAR || fast? || align=right | 5.1 km || 
|-id=471 bgcolor=#E9E9E9
| 83471 ||  || — || September 16, 2001 || Socorro || LINEAR || PAD || align=right | 3.7 km || 
|-id=472 bgcolor=#d6d6d6
| 83472 ||  || — || September 19, 2001 || Socorro || LINEAR || — || align=right | 5.6 km || 
|-id=473 bgcolor=#d6d6d6
| 83473 ||  || — || September 20, 2001 || Socorro || LINEAR || — || align=right | 4.7 km || 
|-id=474 bgcolor=#d6d6d6
| 83474 ||  || — || September 20, 2001 || Socorro || LINEAR || — || align=right | 6.8 km || 
|-id=475 bgcolor=#d6d6d6
| 83475 ||  || — || September 20, 2001 || Socorro || LINEAR || — || align=right | 8.4 km || 
|-id=476 bgcolor=#d6d6d6
| 83476 ||  || — || September 20, 2001 || Socorro || LINEAR || — || align=right | 4.4 km || 
|-id=477 bgcolor=#d6d6d6
| 83477 ||  || — || September 20, 2001 || Socorro || LINEAR || 7:4 || align=right | 7.2 km || 
|-id=478 bgcolor=#d6d6d6
| 83478 ||  || — || September 20, 2001 || Socorro || LINEAR || EOS || align=right | 3.3 km || 
|-id=479 bgcolor=#d6d6d6
| 83479 ||  || — || September 20, 2001 || Socorro || LINEAR || — || align=right | 6.8 km || 
|-id=480 bgcolor=#E9E9E9
| 83480 ||  || — || September 20, 2001 || Socorro || LINEAR || — || align=right | 4.5 km || 
|-id=481 bgcolor=#d6d6d6
| 83481 ||  || — || September 20, 2001 || Socorro || LINEAR || K-2 || align=right | 2.4 km || 
|-id=482 bgcolor=#d6d6d6
| 83482 ||  || — || September 20, 2001 || Socorro || LINEAR || — || align=right | 6.1 km || 
|-id=483 bgcolor=#d6d6d6
| 83483 ||  || — || September 20, 2001 || Socorro || LINEAR || — || align=right | 4.6 km || 
|-id=484 bgcolor=#d6d6d6
| 83484 ||  || — || September 20, 2001 || Socorro || LINEAR || HYG || align=right | 5.3 km || 
|-id=485 bgcolor=#d6d6d6
| 83485 ||  || — || September 20, 2001 || Socorro || LINEAR || HYG || align=right | 4.6 km || 
|-id=486 bgcolor=#d6d6d6
| 83486 ||  || — || September 20, 2001 || Socorro || LINEAR || — || align=right | 5.5 km || 
|-id=487 bgcolor=#d6d6d6
| 83487 ||  || — || September 20, 2001 || Socorro || LINEAR || — || align=right | 3.7 km || 
|-id=488 bgcolor=#d6d6d6
| 83488 ||  || — || September 20, 2001 || Socorro || LINEAR || URS || align=right | 8.7 km || 
|-id=489 bgcolor=#d6d6d6
| 83489 ||  || — || September 20, 2001 || Socorro || LINEAR || — || align=right | 5.4 km || 
|-id=490 bgcolor=#d6d6d6
| 83490 ||  || — || September 20, 2001 || Socorro || LINEAR || EOS || align=right | 5.6 km || 
|-id=491 bgcolor=#d6d6d6
| 83491 ||  || — || September 20, 2001 || Socorro || LINEAR || ALA || align=right | 9.0 km || 
|-id=492 bgcolor=#E9E9E9
| 83492 ||  || — || September 20, 2001 || Socorro || LINEAR || MAR || align=right | 3.0 km || 
|-id=493 bgcolor=#d6d6d6
| 83493 ||  || — || September 20, 2001 || Socorro || LINEAR || — || align=right | 8.9 km || 
|-id=494 bgcolor=#E9E9E9
| 83494 ||  || — || September 20, 2001 || Desert Eagle || W. K. Y. Yeung || — || align=right | 5.0 km || 
|-id=495 bgcolor=#d6d6d6
| 83495 ||  || — || September 20, 2001 || Desert Eagle || W. K. Y. Yeung || — || align=right | 4.1 km || 
|-id=496 bgcolor=#d6d6d6
| 83496 ||  || — || September 20, 2001 || Desert Eagle || W. K. Y. Yeung || KOR || align=right | 2.7 km || 
|-id=497 bgcolor=#d6d6d6
| 83497 ||  || — || September 16, 2001 || Socorro || LINEAR || — || align=right | 8.0 km || 
|-id=498 bgcolor=#E9E9E9
| 83498 ||  || — || September 16, 2001 || Socorro || LINEAR || — || align=right | 4.4 km || 
|-id=499 bgcolor=#E9E9E9
| 83499 ||  || — || September 16, 2001 || Socorro || LINEAR || — || align=right | 3.4 km || 
|-id=500 bgcolor=#E9E9E9
| 83500 ||  || — || September 16, 2001 || Socorro || LINEAR || — || align=right | 4.2 km || 
|}

83501–83600 

|-bgcolor=#E9E9E9
| 83501 ||  || — || September 16, 2001 || Socorro || LINEAR || — || align=right | 3.7 km || 
|-id=502 bgcolor=#d6d6d6
| 83502 ||  || — || September 16, 2001 || Socorro || LINEAR || — || align=right | 4.0 km || 
|-id=503 bgcolor=#d6d6d6
| 83503 ||  || — || September 16, 2001 || Socorro || LINEAR || — || align=right | 5.5 km || 
|-id=504 bgcolor=#E9E9E9
| 83504 ||  || — || September 16, 2001 || Socorro || LINEAR || PAD || align=right | 5.2 km || 
|-id=505 bgcolor=#d6d6d6
| 83505 ||  || — || September 16, 2001 || Socorro || LINEAR || HYG || align=right | 6.2 km || 
|-id=506 bgcolor=#d6d6d6
| 83506 ||  || — || September 16, 2001 || Socorro || LINEAR || — || align=right | 4.5 km || 
|-id=507 bgcolor=#d6d6d6
| 83507 ||  || — || September 16, 2001 || Socorro || LINEAR || KOR || align=right | 3.1 km || 
|-id=508 bgcolor=#E9E9E9
| 83508 ||  || — || September 16, 2001 || Socorro || LINEAR || — || align=right | 2.9 km || 
|-id=509 bgcolor=#d6d6d6
| 83509 ||  || — || September 16, 2001 || Socorro || LINEAR || — || align=right | 5.0 km || 
|-id=510 bgcolor=#E9E9E9
| 83510 ||  || — || September 16, 2001 || Socorro || LINEAR || — || align=right | 2.5 km || 
|-id=511 bgcolor=#d6d6d6
| 83511 ||  || — || September 16, 2001 || Socorro || LINEAR || — || align=right | 8.4 km || 
|-id=512 bgcolor=#d6d6d6
| 83512 ||  || — || September 16, 2001 || Socorro || LINEAR || EOS || align=right | 5.6 km || 
|-id=513 bgcolor=#d6d6d6
| 83513 ||  || — || September 16, 2001 || Socorro || LINEAR || — || align=right | 4.2 km || 
|-id=514 bgcolor=#d6d6d6
| 83514 ||  || — || September 16, 2001 || Socorro || LINEAR || EOS || align=right | 4.0 km || 
|-id=515 bgcolor=#d6d6d6
| 83515 ||  || — || September 16, 2001 || Socorro || LINEAR || — || align=right | 4.4 km || 
|-id=516 bgcolor=#d6d6d6
| 83516 ||  || — || September 16, 2001 || Socorro || LINEAR || EOS || align=right | 3.8 km || 
|-id=517 bgcolor=#d6d6d6
| 83517 ||  || — || September 16, 2001 || Socorro || LINEAR || — || align=right | 4.2 km || 
|-id=518 bgcolor=#d6d6d6
| 83518 ||  || — || September 16, 2001 || Socorro || LINEAR || — || align=right | 5.0 km || 
|-id=519 bgcolor=#d6d6d6
| 83519 ||  || — || September 16, 2001 || Socorro || LINEAR || KOR || align=right | 2.3 km || 
|-id=520 bgcolor=#E9E9E9
| 83520 ||  || — || September 16, 2001 || Socorro || LINEAR || — || align=right | 6.7 km || 
|-id=521 bgcolor=#E9E9E9
| 83521 ||  || — || September 16, 2001 || Socorro || LINEAR || — || align=right | 5.5 km || 
|-id=522 bgcolor=#d6d6d6
| 83522 ||  || — || September 16, 2001 || Socorro || LINEAR || — || align=right | 5.7 km || 
|-id=523 bgcolor=#E9E9E9
| 83523 ||  || — || September 16, 2001 || Socorro || LINEAR || — || align=right | 3.5 km || 
|-id=524 bgcolor=#d6d6d6
| 83524 ||  || — || September 17, 2001 || Socorro || LINEAR || TEL || align=right | 4.5 km || 
|-id=525 bgcolor=#d6d6d6
| 83525 ||  || — || September 17, 2001 || Socorro || LINEAR || — || align=right | 6.1 km || 
|-id=526 bgcolor=#d6d6d6
| 83526 ||  || — || September 17, 2001 || Socorro || LINEAR || — || align=right | 5.4 km || 
|-id=527 bgcolor=#d6d6d6
| 83527 ||  || — || September 17, 2001 || Socorro || LINEAR || TEL || align=right | 3.4 km || 
|-id=528 bgcolor=#E9E9E9
| 83528 ||  || — || September 17, 2001 || Socorro || LINEAR || AGN || align=right | 5.1 km || 
|-id=529 bgcolor=#d6d6d6
| 83529 ||  || — || September 17, 2001 || Socorro || LINEAR || — || align=right | 7.9 km || 
|-id=530 bgcolor=#d6d6d6
| 83530 ||  || — || September 17, 2001 || Socorro || LINEAR || KOR || align=right | 3.3 km || 
|-id=531 bgcolor=#d6d6d6
| 83531 ||  || — || September 17, 2001 || Socorro || LINEAR || EOS || align=right | 5.2 km || 
|-id=532 bgcolor=#E9E9E9
| 83532 ||  || — || September 17, 2001 || Socorro || LINEAR || — || align=right | 3.9 km || 
|-id=533 bgcolor=#E9E9E9
| 83533 ||  || — || September 17, 2001 || Socorro || LINEAR || GEF || align=right | 3.3 km || 
|-id=534 bgcolor=#d6d6d6
| 83534 ||  || — || September 17, 2001 || Socorro || LINEAR || — || align=right | 7.2 km || 
|-id=535 bgcolor=#d6d6d6
| 83535 ||  || — || September 17, 2001 || Socorro || LINEAR || — || align=right | 4.5 km || 
|-id=536 bgcolor=#d6d6d6
| 83536 ||  || — || September 17, 2001 || Socorro || LINEAR || EOS || align=right | 6.1 km || 
|-id=537 bgcolor=#E9E9E9
| 83537 ||  || — || September 17, 2001 || Socorro || LINEAR || — || align=right | 4.6 km || 
|-id=538 bgcolor=#d6d6d6
| 83538 ||  || — || September 17, 2001 || Socorro || LINEAR || EUP || align=right | 9.1 km || 
|-id=539 bgcolor=#d6d6d6
| 83539 ||  || — || September 17, 2001 || Socorro || LINEAR || — || align=right | 6.8 km || 
|-id=540 bgcolor=#E9E9E9
| 83540 ||  || — || September 17, 2001 || Socorro || LINEAR || — || align=right | 4.8 km || 
|-id=541 bgcolor=#d6d6d6
| 83541 ||  || — || September 17, 2001 || Socorro || LINEAR || — || align=right | 8.4 km || 
|-id=542 bgcolor=#d6d6d6
| 83542 ||  || — || September 19, 2001 || Socorro || LINEAR || KOR || align=right | 2.6 km || 
|-id=543 bgcolor=#d6d6d6
| 83543 ||  || — || September 19, 2001 || Socorro || LINEAR || — || align=right | 7.5 km || 
|-id=544 bgcolor=#d6d6d6
| 83544 ||  || — || September 17, 2001 || Palomar || NEAT || ALA || align=right | 10 km || 
|-id=545 bgcolor=#E9E9E9
| 83545 ||  || — || September 16, 2001 || Socorro || LINEAR || NEM || align=right | 4.0 km || 
|-id=546 bgcolor=#d6d6d6
| 83546 ||  || — || September 16, 2001 || Socorro || LINEAR || — || align=right | 5.3 km || 
|-id=547 bgcolor=#d6d6d6
| 83547 ||  || — || September 16, 2001 || Socorro || LINEAR || ALA || align=right | 9.6 km || 
|-id=548 bgcolor=#E9E9E9
| 83548 ||  || — || September 16, 2001 || Socorro || LINEAR || — || align=right | 2.6 km || 
|-id=549 bgcolor=#d6d6d6
| 83549 ||  || — || September 16, 2001 || Socorro || LINEAR || — || align=right | 7.0 km || 
|-id=550 bgcolor=#d6d6d6
| 83550 ||  || — || September 16, 2001 || Socorro || LINEAR || EOS || align=right | 5.1 km || 
|-id=551 bgcolor=#d6d6d6
| 83551 ||  || — || September 16, 2001 || Socorro || LINEAR || — || align=right | 6.9 km || 
|-id=552 bgcolor=#d6d6d6
| 83552 ||  || — || September 16, 2001 || Socorro || LINEAR || — || align=right | 3.5 km || 
|-id=553 bgcolor=#d6d6d6
| 83553 ||  || — || September 16, 2001 || Socorro || LINEAR || — || align=right | 4.5 km || 
|-id=554 bgcolor=#d6d6d6
| 83554 ||  || — || September 16, 2001 || Socorro || LINEAR || EOS || align=right | 4.3 km || 
|-id=555 bgcolor=#E9E9E9
| 83555 ||  || — || September 19, 2001 || Socorro || LINEAR || — || align=right | 3.5 km || 
|-id=556 bgcolor=#E9E9E9
| 83556 ||  || — || September 19, 2001 || Socorro || LINEAR || HOF || align=right | 6.7 km || 
|-id=557 bgcolor=#d6d6d6
| 83557 ||  || — || September 19, 2001 || Socorro || LINEAR || — || align=right | 6.5 km || 
|-id=558 bgcolor=#d6d6d6
| 83558 ||  || — || September 19, 2001 || Socorro || LINEAR || KOR || align=right | 3.2 km || 
|-id=559 bgcolor=#d6d6d6
| 83559 ||  || — || September 19, 2001 || Socorro || LINEAR || EOS || align=right | 4.7 km || 
|-id=560 bgcolor=#d6d6d6
| 83560 ||  || — || September 19, 2001 || Socorro || LINEAR || — || align=right | 7.6 km || 
|-id=561 bgcolor=#E9E9E9
| 83561 ||  || — || September 19, 2001 || Socorro || LINEAR || NEM || align=right | 4.1 km || 
|-id=562 bgcolor=#d6d6d6
| 83562 ||  || — || September 19, 2001 || Socorro || LINEAR || THM || align=right | 4.3 km || 
|-id=563 bgcolor=#d6d6d6
| 83563 ||  || — || September 19, 2001 || Socorro || LINEAR || HYG || align=right | 6.7 km || 
|-id=564 bgcolor=#E9E9E9
| 83564 ||  || — || September 19, 2001 || Socorro || LINEAR || — || align=right | 3.2 km || 
|-id=565 bgcolor=#d6d6d6
| 83565 ||  || — || September 19, 2001 || Socorro || LINEAR || KOR || align=right | 3.4 km || 
|-id=566 bgcolor=#E9E9E9
| 83566 ||  || — || September 19, 2001 || Socorro || LINEAR || — || align=right | 4.9 km || 
|-id=567 bgcolor=#d6d6d6
| 83567 ||  || — || September 19, 2001 || Socorro || LINEAR || EOS || align=right | 4.3 km || 
|-id=568 bgcolor=#E9E9E9
| 83568 ||  || — || September 19, 2001 || Socorro || LINEAR || — || align=right | 3.9 km || 
|-id=569 bgcolor=#d6d6d6
| 83569 ||  || — || September 19, 2001 || Socorro || LINEAR || THM || align=right | 5.9 km || 
|-id=570 bgcolor=#d6d6d6
| 83570 ||  || — || September 19, 2001 || Socorro || LINEAR || — || align=right | 7.6 km || 
|-id=571 bgcolor=#d6d6d6
| 83571 ||  || — || September 19, 2001 || Socorro || LINEAR || — || align=right | 6.7 km || 
|-id=572 bgcolor=#d6d6d6
| 83572 ||  || — || September 19, 2001 || Socorro || LINEAR || KOR || align=right | 2.6 km || 
|-id=573 bgcolor=#d6d6d6
| 83573 ||  || — || September 19, 2001 || Socorro || LINEAR || EOS || align=right | 5.6 km || 
|-id=574 bgcolor=#d6d6d6
| 83574 ||  || — || September 19, 2001 || Socorro || LINEAR || THM || align=right | 5.4 km || 
|-id=575 bgcolor=#d6d6d6
| 83575 ||  || — || September 19, 2001 || Socorro || LINEAR || — || align=right | 5.9 km || 
|-id=576 bgcolor=#d6d6d6
| 83576 ||  || — || September 19, 2001 || Socorro || LINEAR || — || align=right | 5.2 km || 
|-id=577 bgcolor=#E9E9E9
| 83577 ||  || — || September 19, 2001 || Socorro || LINEAR || INO || align=right | 2.7 km || 
|-id=578 bgcolor=#d6d6d6
| 83578 ||  || — || September 19, 2001 || Socorro || LINEAR || THM || align=right | 7.0 km || 
|-id=579 bgcolor=#E9E9E9
| 83579 ||  || — || September 19, 2001 || Socorro || LINEAR || — || align=right | 1.7 km || 
|-id=580 bgcolor=#d6d6d6
| 83580 ||  || — || September 19, 2001 || Socorro || LINEAR || — || align=right | 5.6 km || 
|-id=581 bgcolor=#d6d6d6
| 83581 ||  || — || September 19, 2001 || Socorro || LINEAR || — || align=right | 6.9 km || 
|-id=582 bgcolor=#E9E9E9
| 83582 ||  || — || September 19, 2001 || Socorro || LINEAR || HNA || align=right | 5.0 km || 
|-id=583 bgcolor=#d6d6d6
| 83583 ||  || — || September 19, 2001 || Socorro || LINEAR || — || align=right | 6.2 km || 
|-id=584 bgcolor=#d6d6d6
| 83584 ||  || — || September 19, 2001 || Socorro || LINEAR || — || align=right | 6.5 km || 
|-id=585 bgcolor=#E9E9E9
| 83585 ||  || — || September 19, 2001 || Socorro || LINEAR || WIT || align=right | 2.5 km || 
|-id=586 bgcolor=#d6d6d6
| 83586 ||  || — || September 19, 2001 || Socorro || LINEAR || KOR || align=right | 3.2 km || 
|-id=587 bgcolor=#d6d6d6
| 83587 ||  || — || September 19, 2001 || Socorro || LINEAR || — || align=right | 4.6 km || 
|-id=588 bgcolor=#d6d6d6
| 83588 ||  || — || September 19, 2001 || Socorro || LINEAR || — || align=right | 6.0 km || 
|-id=589 bgcolor=#d6d6d6
| 83589 ||  || — || September 19, 2001 || Socorro || LINEAR || KOR || align=right | 3.0 km || 
|-id=590 bgcolor=#d6d6d6
| 83590 ||  || — || September 19, 2001 || Socorro || LINEAR || VER || align=right | 6.0 km || 
|-id=591 bgcolor=#d6d6d6
| 83591 ||  || — || September 19, 2001 || Socorro || LINEAR || — || align=right | 5.5 km || 
|-id=592 bgcolor=#E9E9E9
| 83592 ||  || — || September 19, 2001 || Socorro || LINEAR || WIT || align=right | 2.4 km || 
|-id=593 bgcolor=#d6d6d6
| 83593 ||  || — || September 19, 2001 || Socorro || LINEAR || KOR || align=right | 2.9 km || 
|-id=594 bgcolor=#d6d6d6
| 83594 ||  || — || September 19, 2001 || Socorro || LINEAR || — || align=right | 2.9 km || 
|-id=595 bgcolor=#d6d6d6
| 83595 ||  || — || September 19, 2001 || Socorro || LINEAR || KOR || align=right | 3.2 km || 
|-id=596 bgcolor=#d6d6d6
| 83596 ||  || — || September 25, 2001 || Emerald Lane || L. Ball || — || align=right | 5.0 km || 
|-id=597 bgcolor=#d6d6d6
| 83597 ||  || — || September 25, 2001 || Fountain Hills || C. W. Juels, P. R. Holvorcem || — || align=right | 5.0 km || 
|-id=598 bgcolor=#d6d6d6
| 83598 Aiweiwei ||  ||  || September 25, 2001 || Desert Eagle || W. K. Y. Yeung || — || align=right | 5.9 km || 
|-id=599 bgcolor=#d6d6d6
| 83599 ||  || — || September 25, 2001 || Desert Eagle || W. K. Y. Yeung || URS || align=right | 11 km || 
|-id=600 bgcolor=#d6d6d6
| 83600 Yuchunshun ||  ||  || September 25, 2001 || Desert Eagle || W. K. Y. Yeung || — || align=right | 4.4 km || 
|}

83601–83700 

|-bgcolor=#d6d6d6
| 83601 ||  || — || September 25, 2001 || Desert Eagle || W. K. Y. Yeung || KOR || align=right | 3.9 km || 
|-id=602 bgcolor=#E9E9E9
| 83602 ||  || — || September 25, 2001 || Desert Eagle || W. K. Y. Yeung || — || align=right | 4.1 km || 
|-id=603 bgcolor=#d6d6d6
| 83603 ||  || — || September 19, 2001 || Kitt Peak || Spacewatch || — || align=right | 3.2 km || 
|-id=604 bgcolor=#d6d6d6
| 83604 ||  || — || September 26, 2001 || Fountain Hills || C. W. Juels, P. R. Holvorcem || — || align=right | 15 km || 
|-id=605 bgcolor=#d6d6d6
| 83605 ||  || — || September 26, 2001 || Fountain Hills || C. W. Juels, P. R. Holvorcem || — || align=right | 6.7 km || 
|-id=606 bgcolor=#E9E9E9
| 83606 ||  || — || September 16, 2001 || Palomar || NEAT || GEF || align=right | 3.8 km || 
|-id=607 bgcolor=#d6d6d6
| 83607 ||  || — || September 20, 2001 || Socorro || LINEAR || KOR || align=right | 3.2 km || 
|-id=608 bgcolor=#d6d6d6
| 83608 ||  || — || September 21, 2001 || Socorro || LINEAR || KOR || align=right | 3.1 km || 
|-id=609 bgcolor=#E9E9E9
| 83609 ||  || — || September 24, 2001 || Fountain Hills || C. W. Juels, P. R. Holvorcem || JUN || align=right | 3.1 km || 
|-id=610 bgcolor=#d6d6d6
| 83610 ||  || — || September 18, 2001 || Kitt Peak || Spacewatch || — || align=right | 3.7 km || 
|-id=611 bgcolor=#d6d6d6
| 83611 ||  || — || September 21, 2001 || Anderson Mesa || LONEOS || — || align=right | 9.8 km || 
|-id=612 bgcolor=#E9E9E9
| 83612 ||  || — || September 21, 2001 || Anderson Mesa || LONEOS || BRU || align=right | 5.8 km || 
|-id=613 bgcolor=#d6d6d6
| 83613 ||  || — || September 22, 2001 || Palomar || NEAT || EOS || align=right | 5.5 km || 
|-id=614 bgcolor=#E9E9E9
| 83614 ||  || — || September 22, 2001 || Palomar || NEAT || — || align=right | 2.3 km || 
|-id=615 bgcolor=#d6d6d6
| 83615 ||  || — || September 22, 2001 || Palomar || NEAT || — || align=right | 4.8 km || 
|-id=616 bgcolor=#d6d6d6
| 83616 ||  || — || September 27, 2001 || Palomar || NEAT || — || align=right | 9.9 km || 
|-id=617 bgcolor=#d6d6d6
| 83617 ||  || — || September 27, 2001 || Palomar || NEAT || BRA || align=right | 6.3 km || 
|-id=618 bgcolor=#E9E9E9
| 83618 ||  || — || September 29, 2001 || Palomar || NEAT || — || align=right | 2.5 km || 
|-id=619 bgcolor=#E9E9E9
| 83619 ||  || — || September 21, 2001 || Anderson Mesa || LONEOS || — || align=right | 3.1 km || 
|-id=620 bgcolor=#d6d6d6
| 83620 ||  || — || September 16, 2001 || Socorro || LINEAR || — || align=right | 7.5 km || 
|-id=621 bgcolor=#d6d6d6
| 83621 ||  || — || September 21, 2001 || Socorro || LINEAR || — || align=right | 6.4 km || 
|-id=622 bgcolor=#d6d6d6
| 83622 ||  || — || September 22, 2001 || Socorro || LINEAR || — || align=right | 4.3 km || 
|-id=623 bgcolor=#d6d6d6
| 83623 ||  || — || September 21, 2001 || Socorro || LINEAR || KOR || align=right | 2.9 km || 
|-id=624 bgcolor=#d6d6d6
| 83624 ||  || — || September 21, 2001 || Socorro || LINEAR || — || align=right | 5.6 km || 
|-id=625 bgcolor=#d6d6d6
| 83625 ||  || — || September 21, 2001 || Socorro || LINEAR || EOS || align=right | 4.1 km || 
|-id=626 bgcolor=#d6d6d6
| 83626 ||  || — || September 21, 2001 || Socorro || LINEAR || EOS || align=right | 5.0 km || 
|-id=627 bgcolor=#d6d6d6
| 83627 ||  || — || September 25, 2001 || Socorro || LINEAR || — || align=right | 7.2 km || 
|-id=628 bgcolor=#E9E9E9
| 83628 ||  || — || September 25, 2001 || Socorro || LINEAR || — || align=right | 8.1 km || 
|-id=629 bgcolor=#E9E9E9
| 83629 ||  || — || September 24, 2001 || Anderson Mesa || LONEOS || HNS || align=right | 3.3 km || 
|-id=630 bgcolor=#E9E9E9
| 83630 ||  || — || September 25, 2001 || Palomar || NEAT || — || align=right | 4.7 km || 
|-id=631 bgcolor=#E9E9E9
| 83631 ||  || — || September 25, 2001 || Palomar || NEAT || PAD || align=right | 5.7 km || 
|-id=632 bgcolor=#d6d6d6
| 83632 ||  || — || September 25, 2001 || Socorro || LINEAR || — || align=right | 6.3 km || 
|-id=633 bgcolor=#d6d6d6
| 83633 ||  || — || September 25, 2001 || Socorro || LINEAR || EOS || align=right | 4.7 km || 
|-id=634 bgcolor=#d6d6d6
| 83634 ||  || — || September 16, 2001 || Socorro || LINEAR || — || align=right | 6.2 km || 
|-id=635 bgcolor=#d6d6d6
| 83635 ||  || — || September 16, 2001 || Socorro || LINEAR || EOS || align=right | 4.0 km || 
|-id=636 bgcolor=#d6d6d6
| 83636 ||  || — || September 18, 2001 || Anderson Mesa || LONEOS || — || align=right | 7.1 km || 
|-id=637 bgcolor=#E9E9E9
| 83637 ||  || — || September 18, 2001 || Anderson Mesa || LONEOS || — || align=right | 4.8 km || 
|-id=638 bgcolor=#E9E9E9
| 83638 ||  || — || September 19, 2001 || Kitt Peak || Spacewatch || — || align=right | 1.9 km || 
|-id=639 bgcolor=#E9E9E9
| 83639 ||  || — || September 19, 2001 || Kitt Peak || Spacewatch || — || align=right | 4.0 km || 
|-id=640 bgcolor=#d6d6d6
| 83640 ||  || — || September 20, 2001 || Kitt Peak || Spacewatch || — || align=right | 5.1 km || 
|-id=641 bgcolor=#d6d6d6
| 83641 ||  || — || September 20, 2001 || Socorro || LINEAR || HYG || align=right | 5.8 km || 
|-id=642 bgcolor=#E9E9E9
| 83642 ||  || — || September 21, 2001 || Anderson Mesa || LONEOS || ADE || align=right | 6.5 km || 
|-id=643 bgcolor=#E9E9E9
| 83643 ||  || — || September 22, 2001 || Palomar || NEAT || HNS || align=right | 2.5 km || 
|-id=644 bgcolor=#d6d6d6
| 83644 ||  || — || September 22, 2001 || Palomar || NEAT || — || align=right | 7.6 km || 
|-id=645 bgcolor=#E9E9E9
| 83645 ||  || — || September 23, 2001 || Socorro || LINEAR || — || align=right | 2.9 km || 
|-id=646 bgcolor=#d6d6d6
| 83646 ||  || — || September 23, 2001 || Haleakala || NEAT || — || align=right | 4.8 km || 
|-id=647 bgcolor=#d6d6d6
| 83647 ||  || — || September 25, 2001 || Socorro || LINEAR || — || align=right | 9.0 km || 
|-id=648 bgcolor=#E9E9E9
| 83648 ||  || — || September 17, 2001 || Anderson Mesa || LONEOS || — || align=right | 5.6 km || 
|-id=649 bgcolor=#d6d6d6
| 83649 ||  || — || October 6, 2001 || Palomar || NEAT || — || align=right | 4.0 km || 
|-id=650 bgcolor=#d6d6d6
| 83650 ||  || — || October 7, 2001 || Palomar || NEAT || KOR || align=right | 2.9 km || 
|-id=651 bgcolor=#d6d6d6
| 83651 ||  || — || October 10, 2001 || Palomar || NEAT || — || align=right | 3.9 km || 
|-id=652 bgcolor=#d6d6d6
| 83652 ||  || — || October 9, 2001 || Socorro || LINEAR || URS || align=right | 8.8 km || 
|-id=653 bgcolor=#d6d6d6
| 83653 ||  || — || October 13, 2001 || Socorro || LINEAR || — || align=right | 5.9 km || 
|-id=654 bgcolor=#d6d6d6
| 83654 ||  || — || October 13, 2001 || Socorro || LINEAR || — || align=right | 5.1 km || 
|-id=655 bgcolor=#d6d6d6
| 83655 ||  || — || October 13, 2001 || Socorro || LINEAR || — || align=right | 6.2 km || 
|-id=656 bgcolor=#d6d6d6
| 83656 ||  || — || October 13, 2001 || Socorro || LINEAR || THM || align=right | 6.9 km || 
|-id=657 bgcolor=#d6d6d6
| 83657 Albertosordi ||  ||  || October 12, 2001 || Colleverde || V. S. Casulli || — || align=right | 10 km || 
|-id=658 bgcolor=#d6d6d6
| 83658 ||  || — || October 10, 2001 || Palomar || NEAT || — || align=right | 5.7 km || 
|-id=659 bgcolor=#d6d6d6
| 83659 ||  || — || October 11, 2001 || Socorro || LINEAR || — || align=right | 6.2 km || 
|-id=660 bgcolor=#d6d6d6
| 83660 ||  || — || October 11, 2001 || Socorro || LINEAR || EOS || align=right | 3.4 km || 
|-id=661 bgcolor=#d6d6d6
| 83661 ||  || — || October 13, 2001 || Goodricke-Pigott || R. A. Tucker || URS || align=right | 9.1 km || 
|-id=662 bgcolor=#d6d6d6
| 83662 ||  || — || October 14, 2001 || Desert Eagle || W. K. Y. Yeung || ALA || align=right | 8.1 km || 
|-id=663 bgcolor=#E9E9E9
| 83663 ||  || — || October 9, 2001 || Socorro || LINEAR || — || align=right | 5.9 km || 
|-id=664 bgcolor=#E9E9E9
| 83664 ||  || — || October 9, 2001 || Socorro || LINEAR || — || align=right | 7.4 km || 
|-id=665 bgcolor=#E9E9E9
| 83665 ||  || — || October 11, 2001 || Socorro || LINEAR || — || align=right | 2.3 km || 
|-id=666 bgcolor=#d6d6d6
| 83666 ||  || — || October 11, 2001 || Socorro || LINEAR || — || align=right | 10 km || 
|-id=667 bgcolor=#E9E9E9
| 83667 ||  || — || October 13, 2001 || Socorro || LINEAR || EUN || align=right | 2.8 km || 
|-id=668 bgcolor=#d6d6d6
| 83668 ||  || — || October 14, 2001 || Socorro || LINEAR || EOS || align=right | 4.0 km || 
|-id=669 bgcolor=#d6d6d6
| 83669 ||  || — || October 14, 2001 || Socorro || LINEAR || — || align=right | 4.7 km || 
|-id=670 bgcolor=#d6d6d6
| 83670 ||  || — || October 14, 2001 || Socorro || LINEAR || — || align=right | 6.5 km || 
|-id=671 bgcolor=#d6d6d6
| 83671 ||  || — || October 14, 2001 || Socorro || LINEAR || EOS || align=right | 3.8 km || 
|-id=672 bgcolor=#E9E9E9
| 83672 ||  || — || October 14, 2001 || Socorro || LINEAR || — || align=right | 6.7 km || 
|-id=673 bgcolor=#d6d6d6
| 83673 ||  || — || October 14, 2001 || Socorro || LINEAR || — || align=right | 7.8 km || 
|-id=674 bgcolor=#E9E9E9
| 83674 ||  || — || October 14, 2001 || Socorro || LINEAR || ADE || align=right | 7.6 km || 
|-id=675 bgcolor=#d6d6d6
| 83675 ||  || — || October 14, 2001 || Desert Eagle || W. K. Y. Yeung || VER || align=right | 8.3 km || 
|-id=676 bgcolor=#d6d6d6
| 83676 ||  || — || October 9, 2001 || Kitt Peak || Spacewatch || — || align=right | 6.0 km || 
|-id=677 bgcolor=#d6d6d6
| 83677 ||  || — || October 15, 2001 || Desert Eagle || W. K. Y. Yeung || HYG || align=right | 5.9 km || 
|-id=678 bgcolor=#d6d6d6
| 83678 ||  || — || October 15, 2001 || Desert Eagle || W. K. Y. Yeung || ITH || align=right | 3.3 km || 
|-id=679 bgcolor=#E9E9E9
| 83679 ||  || — || October 14, 2001 || Cima Ekar || ADAS || — || align=right | 2.4 km || 
|-id=680 bgcolor=#E9E9E9
| 83680 ||  || — || October 15, 2001 || Desert Eagle || W. K. Y. Yeung || — || align=right | 2.8 km || 
|-id=681 bgcolor=#d6d6d6
| 83681 ||  || — || October 13, 2001 || Socorro || LINEAR || — || align=right | 6.9 km || 
|-id=682 bgcolor=#E9E9E9
| 83682 ||  || — || October 13, 2001 || Socorro || LINEAR || — || align=right | 8.0 km || 
|-id=683 bgcolor=#d6d6d6
| 83683 ||  || — || October 13, 2001 || Socorro || LINEAR || EOS || align=right | 3.8 km || 
|-id=684 bgcolor=#d6d6d6
| 83684 ||  || — || October 13, 2001 || Socorro || LINEAR || — || align=right | 7.3 km || 
|-id=685 bgcolor=#E9E9E9
| 83685 ||  || — || October 13, 2001 || Socorro || LINEAR || AGN || align=right | 2.7 km || 
|-id=686 bgcolor=#d6d6d6
| 83686 ||  || — || October 13, 2001 || Socorro || LINEAR || — || align=right | 3.8 km || 
|-id=687 bgcolor=#d6d6d6
| 83687 ||  || — || October 14, 2001 || Socorro || LINEAR || — || align=right | 7.5 km || 
|-id=688 bgcolor=#E9E9E9
| 83688 ||  || — || October 14, 2001 || Socorro || LINEAR || NEM || align=right | 4.6 km || 
|-id=689 bgcolor=#d6d6d6
| 83689 ||  || — || October 13, 2001 || Socorro || LINEAR || — || align=right | 6.7 km || 
|-id=690 bgcolor=#E9E9E9
| 83690 ||  || — || October 13, 2001 || Socorro || LINEAR || MIS || align=right | 5.0 km || 
|-id=691 bgcolor=#d6d6d6
| 83691 ||  || — || October 13, 2001 || Socorro || LINEAR || — || align=right | 6.6 km || 
|-id=692 bgcolor=#d6d6d6
| 83692 ||  || — || October 13, 2001 || Socorro || LINEAR || — || align=right | 5.0 km || 
|-id=693 bgcolor=#d6d6d6
| 83693 ||  || — || October 13, 2001 || Socorro || LINEAR || — || align=right | 4.7 km || 
|-id=694 bgcolor=#d6d6d6
| 83694 ||  || — || October 13, 2001 || Socorro || LINEAR || KOR || align=right | 4.6 km || 
|-id=695 bgcolor=#d6d6d6
| 83695 ||  || — || October 13, 2001 || Socorro || LINEAR || EOS || align=right | 4.5 km || 
|-id=696 bgcolor=#E9E9E9
| 83696 ||  || — || October 13, 2001 || Socorro || LINEAR || — || align=right | 2.8 km || 
|-id=697 bgcolor=#d6d6d6
| 83697 ||  || — || October 13, 2001 || Socorro || LINEAR || — || align=right | 6.6 km || 
|-id=698 bgcolor=#d6d6d6
| 83698 ||  || — || October 13, 2001 || Socorro || LINEAR || — || align=right | 6.0 km || 
|-id=699 bgcolor=#d6d6d6
| 83699 ||  || — || October 13, 2001 || Socorro || LINEAR || KOR || align=right | 3.1 km || 
|-id=700 bgcolor=#d6d6d6
| 83700 ||  || — || October 13, 2001 || Socorro || LINEAR || EOS || align=right | 5.1 km || 
|}

83701–83800 

|-bgcolor=#d6d6d6
| 83701 ||  || — || October 13, 2001 || Socorro || LINEAR || THM || align=right | 6.4 km || 
|-id=702 bgcolor=#d6d6d6
| 83702 ||  || — || October 13, 2001 || Socorro || LINEAR || — || align=right | 5.7 km || 
|-id=703 bgcolor=#E9E9E9
| 83703 ||  || — || October 13, 2001 || Socorro || LINEAR || GEF || align=right | 2.1 km || 
|-id=704 bgcolor=#d6d6d6
| 83704 ||  || — || October 13, 2001 || Socorro || LINEAR || 629 || align=right | 3.8 km || 
|-id=705 bgcolor=#d6d6d6
| 83705 ||  || — || October 13, 2001 || Socorro || LINEAR || — || align=right | 5.8 km || 
|-id=706 bgcolor=#d6d6d6
| 83706 ||  || — || October 13, 2001 || Socorro || LINEAR || URS || align=right | 7.2 km || 
|-id=707 bgcolor=#d6d6d6
| 83707 ||  || — || October 13, 2001 || Socorro || LINEAR || 628 || align=right | 6.8 km || 
|-id=708 bgcolor=#d6d6d6
| 83708 ||  || — || October 13, 2001 || Socorro || LINEAR || 628 || align=right | 4.3 km || 
|-id=709 bgcolor=#d6d6d6
| 83709 ||  || — || October 14, 2001 || Socorro || LINEAR || — || align=right | 6.3 km || 
|-id=710 bgcolor=#d6d6d6
| 83710 ||  || — || October 14, 2001 || Socorro || LINEAR || — || align=right | 5.6 km || 
|-id=711 bgcolor=#d6d6d6
| 83711 ||  || — || October 14, 2001 || Socorro || LINEAR || — || align=right | 8.2 km || 
|-id=712 bgcolor=#d6d6d6
| 83712 ||  || — || October 14, 2001 || Socorro || LINEAR || — || align=right | 5.2 km || 
|-id=713 bgcolor=#d6d6d6
| 83713 ||  || — || October 14, 2001 || Socorro || LINEAR || — || align=right | 4.7 km || 
|-id=714 bgcolor=#d6d6d6
| 83714 ||  || — || October 14, 2001 || Socorro || LINEAR || — || align=right | 2.9 km || 
|-id=715 bgcolor=#d6d6d6
| 83715 ||  || — || October 14, 2001 || Socorro || LINEAR || — || align=right | 5.7 km || 
|-id=716 bgcolor=#d6d6d6
| 83716 ||  || — || October 14, 2001 || Socorro || LINEAR || — || align=right | 6.6 km || 
|-id=717 bgcolor=#d6d6d6
| 83717 ||  || — || October 14, 2001 || Socorro || LINEAR || — || align=right | 5.7 km || 
|-id=718 bgcolor=#d6d6d6
| 83718 ||  || — || October 14, 2001 || Socorro || LINEAR || — || align=right | 5.9 km || 
|-id=719 bgcolor=#d6d6d6
| 83719 ||  || — || October 14, 2001 || Socorro || LINEAR || — || align=right | 6.6 km || 
|-id=720 bgcolor=#E9E9E9
| 83720 ||  || — || October 14, 2001 || Socorro || LINEAR || — || align=right | 3.5 km || 
|-id=721 bgcolor=#d6d6d6
| 83721 ||  || — || October 14, 2001 || Socorro || LINEAR || — || align=right | 6.2 km || 
|-id=722 bgcolor=#d6d6d6
| 83722 ||  || — || October 14, 2001 || Socorro || LINEAR || SHU3:2 || align=right | 15 km || 
|-id=723 bgcolor=#d6d6d6
| 83723 ||  || — || October 14, 2001 || Socorro || LINEAR || — || align=right | 6.0 km || 
|-id=724 bgcolor=#d6d6d6
| 83724 ||  || — || October 14, 2001 || Socorro || LINEAR || EOS || align=right | 3.9 km || 
|-id=725 bgcolor=#d6d6d6
| 83725 ||  || — || October 15, 2001 || Desert Eagle || W. K. Y. Yeung || EMA || align=right | 7.0 km || 
|-id=726 bgcolor=#d6d6d6
| 83726 ||  || — || October 13, 2001 || Socorro || LINEAR || CHA || align=right | 3.6 km || 
|-id=727 bgcolor=#d6d6d6
| 83727 ||  || — || October 13, 2001 || Socorro || LINEAR || — || align=right | 7.2 km || 
|-id=728 bgcolor=#d6d6d6
| 83728 ||  || — || October 14, 2001 || Socorro || LINEAR || — || align=right | 7.3 km || 
|-id=729 bgcolor=#d6d6d6
| 83729 ||  || — || October 14, 2001 || Socorro || LINEAR || — || align=right | 7.3 km || 
|-id=730 bgcolor=#d6d6d6
| 83730 ||  || — || October 14, 2001 || Socorro || LINEAR || — || align=right | 8.0 km || 
|-id=731 bgcolor=#d6d6d6
| 83731 ||  || — || October 14, 2001 || Socorro || LINEAR || — || align=right | 7.8 km || 
|-id=732 bgcolor=#d6d6d6
| 83732 ||  || — || October 15, 2001 || Socorro || LINEAR || — || align=right | 7.1 km || 
|-id=733 bgcolor=#d6d6d6
| 83733 ||  || — || October 15, 2001 || Socorro || LINEAR || — || align=right | 9.2 km || 
|-id=734 bgcolor=#E9E9E9
| 83734 ||  || — || October 15, 2001 || Socorro || LINEAR || — || align=right | 4.6 km || 
|-id=735 bgcolor=#d6d6d6
| 83735 ||  || — || October 15, 2001 || Socorro || LINEAR || — || align=right | 6.8 km || 
|-id=736 bgcolor=#d6d6d6
| 83736 ||  || — || October 12, 2001 || Haleakala || NEAT || — || align=right | 5.9 km || 
|-id=737 bgcolor=#d6d6d6
| 83737 ||  || — || October 12, 2001 || Haleakala || NEAT || — || align=right | 6.1 km || 
|-id=738 bgcolor=#d6d6d6
| 83738 ||  || — || October 12, 2001 || Haleakala || NEAT || 7:4 || align=right | 7.4 km || 
|-id=739 bgcolor=#d6d6d6
| 83739 ||  || — || October 13, 2001 || Palomar || NEAT || EOS || align=right | 4.6 km || 
|-id=740 bgcolor=#d6d6d6
| 83740 ||  || — || October 8, 2001 || Palomar || NEAT || — || align=right | 4.9 km || 
|-id=741 bgcolor=#E9E9E9
| 83741 ||  || — || October 10, 2001 || Palomar || NEAT || — || align=right | 5.2 km || 
|-id=742 bgcolor=#d6d6d6
| 83742 ||  || — || October 10, 2001 || Palomar || NEAT || — || align=right | 7.0 km || 
|-id=743 bgcolor=#d6d6d6
| 83743 ||  || — || October 12, 2001 || Haleakala || NEAT || — || align=right | 6.5 km || 
|-id=744 bgcolor=#d6d6d6
| 83744 ||  || — || October 13, 2001 || Palomar || NEAT || — || align=right | 6.6 km || 
|-id=745 bgcolor=#d6d6d6
| 83745 ||  || — || October 14, 2001 || Palomar || NEAT || — || align=right | 3.9 km || 
|-id=746 bgcolor=#d6d6d6
| 83746 ||  || — || October 14, 2001 || Palomar || NEAT || — || align=right | 6.9 km || 
|-id=747 bgcolor=#d6d6d6
| 83747 ||  || — || October 14, 2001 || Palomar || NEAT || — || align=right | 6.8 km || 
|-id=748 bgcolor=#d6d6d6
| 83748 ||  || — || October 14, 2001 || Palomar || NEAT || — || align=right | 4.9 km || 
|-id=749 bgcolor=#d6d6d6
| 83749 ||  || — || October 14, 2001 || Palomar || NEAT || — || align=right | 6.9 km || 
|-id=750 bgcolor=#d6d6d6
| 83750 ||  || — || October 14, 2001 || Palomar || NEAT || — || align=right | 4.9 km || 
|-id=751 bgcolor=#d6d6d6
| 83751 ||  || — || October 14, 2001 || Palomar || NEAT || — || align=right | 6.3 km || 
|-id=752 bgcolor=#d6d6d6
| 83752 ||  || — || October 14, 2001 || Palomar || NEAT || — || align=right | 6.9 km || 
|-id=753 bgcolor=#d6d6d6
| 83753 ||  || — || October 10, 2001 || Palomar || NEAT || — || align=right | 3.4 km || 
|-id=754 bgcolor=#d6d6d6
| 83754 ||  || — || October 10, 2001 || Palomar || NEAT || — || align=right | 6.5 km || 
|-id=755 bgcolor=#d6d6d6
| 83755 ||  || — || October 10, 2001 || Palomar || NEAT || EOS || align=right | 4.5 km || 
|-id=756 bgcolor=#E9E9E9
| 83756 ||  || — || October 10, 2001 || Palomar || NEAT || GEF || align=right | 2.7 km || 
|-id=757 bgcolor=#d6d6d6
| 83757 ||  || — || October 10, 2001 || Palomar || NEAT || EOS || align=right | 4.8 km || 
|-id=758 bgcolor=#d6d6d6
| 83758 ||  || — || October 10, 2001 || Palomar || NEAT || — || align=right | 6.5 km || 
|-id=759 bgcolor=#fefefe
| 83759 ||  || — || October 10, 2001 || Palomar || NEAT || V || align=right | 1.2 km || 
|-id=760 bgcolor=#d6d6d6
| 83760 ||  || — || October 10, 2001 || Palomar || NEAT || — || align=right | 5.1 km || 
|-id=761 bgcolor=#d6d6d6
| 83761 ||  || — || October 10, 2001 || Palomar || NEAT || — || align=right | 7.5 km || 
|-id=762 bgcolor=#d6d6d6
| 83762 ||  || — || October 10, 2001 || Palomar || NEAT || EOS || align=right | 4.7 km || 
|-id=763 bgcolor=#d6d6d6
| 83763 ||  || — || October 13, 2001 || Palomar || NEAT || EOS || align=right | 5.3 km || 
|-id=764 bgcolor=#d6d6d6
| 83764 ||  || — || October 10, 2001 || Palomar || NEAT || — || align=right | 7.9 km || 
|-id=765 bgcolor=#d6d6d6
| 83765 ||  || — || October 12, 2001 || Haleakala || NEAT || — || align=right | 8.0 km || 
|-id=766 bgcolor=#d6d6d6
| 83766 ||  || — || October 12, 2001 || Haleakala || NEAT || — || align=right | 8.2 km || 
|-id=767 bgcolor=#d6d6d6
| 83767 ||  || — || October 11, 2001 || Palomar || NEAT || — || align=right | 3.8 km || 
|-id=768 bgcolor=#d6d6d6
| 83768 ||  || — || October 11, 2001 || Palomar || NEAT || EOS || align=right | 3.8 km || 
|-id=769 bgcolor=#d6d6d6
| 83769 ||  || — || October 11, 2001 || Palomar || NEAT || — || align=right | 3.9 km || 
|-id=770 bgcolor=#d6d6d6
| 83770 ||  || — || October 11, 2001 || Palomar || NEAT || — || align=right | 4.1 km || 
|-id=771 bgcolor=#E9E9E9
| 83771 ||  || — || October 15, 2001 || Palomar || NEAT || CLO || align=right | 6.3 km || 
|-id=772 bgcolor=#d6d6d6
| 83772 ||  || — || October 15, 2001 || Palomar || NEAT || — || align=right | 4.6 km || 
|-id=773 bgcolor=#d6d6d6
| 83773 ||  || — || October 15, 2001 || Palomar || NEAT || — || align=right | 9.1 km || 
|-id=774 bgcolor=#d6d6d6
| 83774 ||  || — || October 15, 2001 || Palomar || NEAT || — || align=right | 5.9 km || 
|-id=775 bgcolor=#E9E9E9
| 83775 ||  || — || October 13, 2001 || Socorro || LINEAR || — || align=right | 3.0 km || 
|-id=776 bgcolor=#d6d6d6
| 83776 ||  || — || October 15, 2001 || Socorro || LINEAR || EOS || align=right | 4.7 km || 
|-id=777 bgcolor=#E9E9E9
| 83777 ||  || — || October 14, 2001 || Socorro || LINEAR || — || align=right | 4.6 km || 
|-id=778 bgcolor=#d6d6d6
| 83778 ||  || — || October 15, 2001 || Palomar || NEAT || — || align=right | 5.2 km || 
|-id=779 bgcolor=#E9E9E9
| 83779 ||  || — || October 11, 2001 || Socorro || LINEAR || — || align=right | 3.2 km || 
|-id=780 bgcolor=#d6d6d6
| 83780 ||  || — || October 11, 2001 || Socorro || LINEAR || — || align=right | 7.5 km || 
|-id=781 bgcolor=#d6d6d6
| 83781 ||  || — || October 11, 2001 || Socorro || LINEAR || — || align=right | 4.8 km || 
|-id=782 bgcolor=#d6d6d6
| 83782 ||  || — || October 11, 2001 || Socorro || LINEAR || EOS || align=right | 4.7 km || 
|-id=783 bgcolor=#d6d6d6
| 83783 ||  || — || October 11, 2001 || Socorro || LINEAR || EOS || align=right | 4.7 km || 
|-id=784 bgcolor=#d6d6d6
| 83784 ||  || — || October 11, 2001 || Socorro || LINEAR || 629 || align=right | 6.4 km || 
|-id=785 bgcolor=#d6d6d6
| 83785 ||  || — || October 11, 2001 || Socorro || LINEAR || — || align=right | 6.0 km || 
|-id=786 bgcolor=#d6d6d6
| 83786 ||  || — || October 11, 2001 || Socorro || LINEAR || — || align=right | 5.2 km || 
|-id=787 bgcolor=#d6d6d6
| 83787 ||  || — || October 11, 2001 || Socorro || LINEAR || — || align=right | 3.4 km || 
|-id=788 bgcolor=#d6d6d6
| 83788 ||  || — || October 11, 2001 || Socorro || LINEAR || — || align=right | 7.1 km || 
|-id=789 bgcolor=#d6d6d6
| 83789 ||  || — || October 11, 2001 || Socorro || LINEAR || VER || align=right | 5.9 km || 
|-id=790 bgcolor=#d6d6d6
| 83790 ||  || — || October 12, 2001 || Haleakala || NEAT || ALA || align=right | 7.8 km || 
|-id=791 bgcolor=#E9E9E9
| 83791 ||  || — || October 13, 2001 || Anderson Mesa || LONEOS || — || align=right | 3.5 km || 
|-id=792 bgcolor=#d6d6d6
| 83792 ||  || — || October 13, 2001 || Anderson Mesa || LONEOS || — || align=right | 7.8 km || 
|-id=793 bgcolor=#d6d6d6
| 83793 ||  || — || October 13, 2001 || Palomar || NEAT || — || align=right | 6.0 km || 
|-id=794 bgcolor=#d6d6d6
| 83794 ||  || — || October 13, 2001 || Palomar || NEAT || EOS || align=right | 4.0 km || 
|-id=795 bgcolor=#E9E9E9
| 83795 ||  || — || October 13, 2001 || Socorro || LINEAR || — || align=right | 2.9 km || 
|-id=796 bgcolor=#d6d6d6
| 83796 ||  || — || October 13, 2001 || Socorro || LINEAR || — || align=right | 4.2 km || 
|-id=797 bgcolor=#d6d6d6
| 83797 ||  || — || October 13, 2001 || Palomar || NEAT || — || align=right | 6.5 km || 
|-id=798 bgcolor=#d6d6d6
| 83798 ||  || — || October 13, 2001 || Palomar || NEAT || EOS || align=right | 4.5 km || 
|-id=799 bgcolor=#E9E9E9
| 83799 ||  || — || October 13, 2001 || Palomar || NEAT || ADE || align=right | 5.3 km || 
|-id=800 bgcolor=#d6d6d6
| 83800 ||  || — || October 14, 2001 || Kitt Peak || Spacewatch || — || align=right | 8.9 km || 
|}

83801–83900 

|-bgcolor=#d6d6d6
| 83801 ||  || — || October 14, 2001 || Anderson Mesa || LONEOS || HIL3:2 || align=right | 8.9 km || 
|-id=802 bgcolor=#d6d6d6
| 83802 ||  || — || October 14, 2001 || Anderson Mesa || LONEOS || VER || align=right | 7.2 km || 
|-id=803 bgcolor=#d6d6d6
| 83803 ||  || — || October 14, 2001 || Anderson Mesa || LONEOS || EOS || align=right | 3.6 km || 
|-id=804 bgcolor=#d6d6d6
| 83804 ||  || — || October 14, 2001 || Socorro || LINEAR || HIL3:2 || align=right | 12 km || 
|-id=805 bgcolor=#d6d6d6
| 83805 ||  || — || October 14, 2001 || Anderson Mesa || LONEOS || EUP || align=right | 8.2 km || 
|-id=806 bgcolor=#d6d6d6
| 83806 ||  || — || October 14, 2001 || Anderson Mesa || LONEOS || — || align=right | 8.8 km || 
|-id=807 bgcolor=#d6d6d6
| 83807 ||  || — || October 14, 2001 || Palomar || NEAT || — || align=right | 4.5 km || 
|-id=808 bgcolor=#d6d6d6
| 83808 ||  || — || October 15, 2001 || Kitt Peak || Spacewatch || — || align=right | 5.7 km || 
|-id=809 bgcolor=#d6d6d6
| 83809 ||  || — || October 15, 2001 || Palomar || NEAT || — || align=right | 5.8 km || 
|-id=810 bgcolor=#d6d6d6
| 83810 ||  || — || October 15, 2001 || Palomar || NEAT || EOS || align=right | 4.0 km || 
|-id=811 bgcolor=#E9E9E9
| 83811 ||  || — || October 15, 2001 || Palomar || NEAT || — || align=right | 3.0 km || 
|-id=812 bgcolor=#E9E9E9
| 83812 ||  || — || October 15, 2001 || Haleakala || NEAT || — || align=right | 3.4 km || 
|-id=813 bgcolor=#d6d6d6
| 83813 ||  || — || October 15, 2001 || Palomar || NEAT || EOS || align=right | 4.0 km || 
|-id=814 bgcolor=#E9E9E9
| 83814 ||  || — || October 10, 2001 || Palomar || NEAT || — || align=right | 6.2 km || 
|-id=815 bgcolor=#d6d6d6
| 83815 ||  || — || October 15, 2001 || Palomar || NEAT || — || align=right | 4.2 km || 
|-id=816 bgcolor=#E9E9E9
| 83816 ||  || — || October 15, 2001 || Palomar || NEAT || EUN || align=right | 3.0 km || 
|-id=817 bgcolor=#d6d6d6
| 83817 ||  || — || October 15, 2001 || Palomar || NEAT || — || align=right | 5.9 km || 
|-id=818 bgcolor=#d6d6d6
| 83818 ||  || — || October 14, 2001 || Socorro || LINEAR || — || align=right | 6.3 km || 
|-id=819 bgcolor=#E9E9E9
| 83819 ||  || — || October 16, 2001 || Socorro || LINEAR || — || align=right | 3.2 km || 
|-id=820 bgcolor=#d6d6d6
| 83820 ||  || — || October 17, 2001 || Desert Eagle || W. K. Y. Yeung || — || align=right | 7.3 km || 
|-id=821 bgcolor=#d6d6d6
| 83821 ||  || — || October 18, 2001 || Desert Eagle || W. K. Y. Yeung || EOS || align=right | 4.4 km || 
|-id=822 bgcolor=#d6d6d6
| 83822 ||  || — || October 17, 2001 || Socorro || LINEAR || — || align=right | 7.4 km || 
|-id=823 bgcolor=#d6d6d6
| 83823 ||  || — || October 17, 2001 || Socorro || LINEAR || — || align=right | 8.7 km || 
|-id=824 bgcolor=#d6d6d6
| 83824 ||  || — || October 25, 2001 || Desert Eagle || W. K. Y. Yeung || EOS || align=right | 4.3 km || 
|-id=825 bgcolor=#d6d6d6
| 83825 ||  || — || October 16, 2001 || Palomar || NEAT || HYG || align=right | 6.0 km || 
|-id=826 bgcolor=#d6d6d6
| 83826 ||  || — || October 16, 2001 || Socorro || LINEAR || — || align=right | 12 km || 
|-id=827 bgcolor=#d6d6d6
| 83827 ||  || — || October 17, 2001 || Socorro || LINEAR || — || align=right | 4.5 km || 
|-id=828 bgcolor=#d6d6d6
| 83828 ||  || — || October 17, 2001 || Socorro || LINEAR || — || align=right | 7.2 km || 
|-id=829 bgcolor=#d6d6d6
| 83829 ||  || — || October 17, 2001 || Socorro || LINEAR || EOS || align=right | 6.2 km || 
|-id=830 bgcolor=#d6d6d6
| 83830 ||  || — || October 17, 2001 || Socorro || LINEAR || — || align=right | 6.9 km || 
|-id=831 bgcolor=#d6d6d6
| 83831 ||  || — || October 18, 2001 || Socorro || LINEAR || — || align=right | 5.9 km || 
|-id=832 bgcolor=#d6d6d6
| 83832 ||  || — || October 18, 2001 || Socorro || LINEAR || — || align=right | 9.3 km || 
|-id=833 bgcolor=#d6d6d6
| 83833 ||  || — || October 18, 2001 || Socorro || LINEAR || — || align=right | 6.5 km || 
|-id=834 bgcolor=#E9E9E9
| 83834 ||  || — || October 18, 2001 || Socorro || LINEAR || — || align=right | 5.7 km || 
|-id=835 bgcolor=#d6d6d6
| 83835 ||  || — || October 18, 2001 || Socorro || LINEAR || EOS || align=right | 5.6 km || 
|-id=836 bgcolor=#d6d6d6
| 83836 ||  || — || October 16, 2001 || Socorro || LINEAR || EOS || align=right | 4.3 km || 
|-id=837 bgcolor=#d6d6d6
| 83837 ||  || — || October 16, 2001 || Socorro || LINEAR || — || align=right | 4.1 km || 
|-id=838 bgcolor=#E9E9E9
| 83838 ||  || — || October 16, 2001 || Socorro || LINEAR || — || align=right | 6.5 km || 
|-id=839 bgcolor=#d6d6d6
| 83839 ||  || — || October 16, 2001 || Socorro || LINEAR || — || align=right | 7.1 km || 
|-id=840 bgcolor=#d6d6d6
| 83840 ||  || — || October 16, 2001 || Socorro || LINEAR || — || align=right | 7.4 km || 
|-id=841 bgcolor=#d6d6d6
| 83841 ||  || — || October 16, 2001 || Socorro || LINEAR || — || align=right | 5.4 km || 
|-id=842 bgcolor=#d6d6d6
| 83842 ||  || — || October 16, 2001 || Socorro || LINEAR || — || align=right | 8.1 km || 
|-id=843 bgcolor=#d6d6d6
| 83843 ||  || — || October 16, 2001 || Socorro || LINEAR || TRP || align=right | 6.9 km || 
|-id=844 bgcolor=#d6d6d6
| 83844 ||  || — || October 16, 2001 || Socorro || LINEAR || — || align=right | 3.9 km || 
|-id=845 bgcolor=#E9E9E9
| 83845 ||  || — || October 16, 2001 || Socorro || LINEAR || — || align=right | 2.3 km || 
|-id=846 bgcolor=#d6d6d6
| 83846 ||  || — || October 16, 2001 || Socorro || LINEAR || — || align=right | 3.2 km || 
|-id=847 bgcolor=#d6d6d6
| 83847 ||  || — || October 17, 2001 || Socorro || LINEAR || — || align=right | 5.8 km || 
|-id=848 bgcolor=#d6d6d6
| 83848 ||  || — || October 17, 2001 || Socorro || LINEAR || — || align=right | 4.9 km || 
|-id=849 bgcolor=#d6d6d6
| 83849 ||  || — || October 17, 2001 || Socorro || LINEAR || EOS || align=right | 4.5 km || 
|-id=850 bgcolor=#d6d6d6
| 83850 ||  || — || October 17, 2001 || Socorro || LINEAR || — || align=right | 5.7 km || 
|-id=851 bgcolor=#E9E9E9
| 83851 ||  || — || October 17, 2001 || Socorro || LINEAR || AGN || align=right | 3.6 km || 
|-id=852 bgcolor=#d6d6d6
| 83852 ||  || — || October 17, 2001 || Socorro || LINEAR || — || align=right | 4.2 km || 
|-id=853 bgcolor=#E9E9E9
| 83853 ||  || — || October 17, 2001 || Socorro || LINEAR || EUN || align=right | 4.2 km || 
|-id=854 bgcolor=#E9E9E9
| 83854 ||  || — || October 17, 2001 || Socorro || LINEAR || — || align=right | 4.5 km || 
|-id=855 bgcolor=#E9E9E9
| 83855 ||  || — || October 17, 2001 || Socorro || LINEAR || — || align=right | 5.1 km || 
|-id=856 bgcolor=#d6d6d6
| 83856 ||  || — || October 16, 2001 || Socorro || LINEAR || HYG || align=right | 5.6 km || 
|-id=857 bgcolor=#E9E9E9
| 83857 ||  || — || October 17, 2001 || Socorro || LINEAR || — || align=right | 4.1 km || 
|-id=858 bgcolor=#d6d6d6
| 83858 ||  || — || October 18, 2001 || Socorro || LINEAR || HYG || align=right | 7.4 km || 
|-id=859 bgcolor=#E9E9E9
| 83859 ||  || — || October 18, 2001 || Socorro || LINEAR || — || align=right | 3.8 km || 
|-id=860 bgcolor=#d6d6d6
| 83860 ||  || — || October 20, 2001 || Socorro || LINEAR || HYG || align=right | 6.1 km || 
|-id=861 bgcolor=#d6d6d6
| 83861 ||  || — || October 20, 2001 || Socorro || LINEAR || — || align=right | 5.6 km || 
|-id=862 bgcolor=#d6d6d6
| 83862 ||  || — || October 16, 2001 || Haleakala || NEAT || — || align=right | 8.5 km || 
|-id=863 bgcolor=#E9E9E9
| 83863 ||  || — || October 17, 2001 || Haleakala || NEAT || — || align=right | 4.9 km || 
|-id=864 bgcolor=#d6d6d6
| 83864 ||  || — || October 20, 2001 || Haleakala || NEAT || NAE || align=right | 6.9 km || 
|-id=865 bgcolor=#d6d6d6
| 83865 ||  || — || October 17, 2001 || Socorro || LINEAR || — || align=right | 6.0 km || 
|-id=866 bgcolor=#d6d6d6
| 83866 ||  || — || October 17, 2001 || Socorro || LINEAR || — || align=right | 5.0 km || 
|-id=867 bgcolor=#d6d6d6
| 83867 ||  || — || October 17, 2001 || Socorro || LINEAR || HIL3:2 || align=right | 11 km || 
|-id=868 bgcolor=#d6d6d6
| 83868 ||  || — || October 20, 2001 || Socorro || LINEAR || — || align=right | 8.4 km || 
|-id=869 bgcolor=#E9E9E9
| 83869 ||  || — || October 20, 2001 || Haleakala || NEAT || — || align=right | 3.7 km || 
|-id=870 bgcolor=#d6d6d6
| 83870 ||  || — || October 25, 2001 || Socorro || LINEAR || — || align=right | 11 km || 
|-id=871 bgcolor=#d6d6d6
| 83871 ||  || — || October 18, 2001 || Palomar || NEAT || — || align=right | 5.7 km || 
|-id=872 bgcolor=#fefefe
| 83872 ||  || — || October 19, 2001 || Haleakala || NEAT || — || align=right | 3.2 km || 
|-id=873 bgcolor=#d6d6d6
| 83873 ||  || — || October 19, 2001 || Haleakala || NEAT || — || align=right | 4.7 km || 
|-id=874 bgcolor=#d6d6d6
| 83874 ||  || — || October 19, 2001 || Haleakala || NEAT || ALA || align=right | 7.3 km || 
|-id=875 bgcolor=#d6d6d6
| 83875 ||  || — || October 19, 2001 || Palomar || NEAT || — || align=right | 5.0 km || 
|-id=876 bgcolor=#d6d6d6
| 83876 ||  || — || October 17, 2001 || Socorro || LINEAR || THM || align=right | 4.8 km || 
|-id=877 bgcolor=#d6d6d6
| 83877 ||  || — || October 17, 2001 || Socorro || LINEAR || 3:2 || align=right | 7.5 km || 
|-id=878 bgcolor=#d6d6d6
| 83878 ||  || — || October 17, 2001 || Socorro || LINEAR || — || align=right | 4.7 km || 
|-id=879 bgcolor=#d6d6d6
| 83879 ||  || — || October 20, 2001 || Socorro || LINEAR || HYG || align=right | 6.7 km || 
|-id=880 bgcolor=#d6d6d6
| 83880 ||  || — || October 20, 2001 || Socorro || LINEAR || — || align=right | 8.2 km || 
|-id=881 bgcolor=#E9E9E9
| 83881 ||  || — || October 22, 2001 || Socorro || LINEAR || — || align=right | 3.1 km || 
|-id=882 bgcolor=#d6d6d6
| 83882 ||  || — || October 22, 2001 || Socorro || LINEAR || — || align=right | 6.0 km || 
|-id=883 bgcolor=#E9E9E9
| 83883 ||  || — || October 22, 2001 || Palomar || NEAT || — || align=right | 2.4 km || 
|-id=884 bgcolor=#E9E9E9
| 83884 ||  || — || October 22, 2001 || Palomar || NEAT || — || align=right | 5.9 km || 
|-id=885 bgcolor=#d6d6d6
| 83885 ||  || — || October 22, 2001 || Palomar || NEAT || — || align=right | 7.8 km || 
|-id=886 bgcolor=#E9E9E9
| 83886 ||  || — || October 22, 2001 || Palomar || NEAT || — || align=right | 5.4 km || 
|-id=887 bgcolor=#d6d6d6
| 83887 ||  || — || October 28, 2001 || Palomar || NEAT || — || align=right | 10 km || 
|-id=888 bgcolor=#d6d6d6
| 83888 ||  || — || October 17, 2001 || Socorro || LINEAR || — || align=right | 7.7 km || 
|-id=889 bgcolor=#E9E9E9
| 83889 ||  || — || October 20, 2001 || Socorro || LINEAR || — || align=right | 3.9 km || 
|-id=890 bgcolor=#d6d6d6
| 83890 ||  || — || October 20, 2001 || Socorro || LINEAR || — || align=right | 4.7 km || 
|-id=891 bgcolor=#d6d6d6
| 83891 ||  || — || October 21, 2001 || Socorro || LINEAR || — || align=right | 3.4 km || 
|-id=892 bgcolor=#d6d6d6
| 83892 ||  || — || October 22, 2001 || Socorro || LINEAR || EOS || align=right | 4.3 km || 
|-id=893 bgcolor=#d6d6d6
| 83893 ||  || — || October 23, 2001 || Socorro || LINEAR || — || align=right | 7.2 km || 
|-id=894 bgcolor=#d6d6d6
| 83894 ||  || — || October 23, 2001 || Socorro || LINEAR || THM || align=right | 5.0 km || 
|-id=895 bgcolor=#d6d6d6
| 83895 ||  || — || October 23, 2001 || Socorro || LINEAR || — || align=right | 7.5 km || 
|-id=896 bgcolor=#d6d6d6
| 83896 ||  || — || October 23, 2001 || Socorro || LINEAR || HYG || align=right | 6.4 km || 
|-id=897 bgcolor=#d6d6d6
| 83897 ||  || — || October 23, 2001 || Socorro || LINEAR || — || align=right | 4.8 km || 
|-id=898 bgcolor=#d6d6d6
| 83898 ||  || — || October 23, 2001 || Socorro || LINEAR || — || align=right | 4.2 km || 
|-id=899 bgcolor=#d6d6d6
| 83899 ||  || — || October 23, 2001 || Socorro || LINEAR || — || align=right | 8.7 km || 
|-id=900 bgcolor=#d6d6d6
| 83900 ||  || — || October 23, 2001 || Socorro || LINEAR || 3:2 || align=right | 7.5 km || 
|}

83901–84000 

|-bgcolor=#d6d6d6
| 83901 ||  || — || October 17, 2001 || Palomar || NEAT || — || align=right | 7.9 km || 
|-id=902 bgcolor=#E9E9E9
| 83902 ||  || — || October 23, 2001 || Palomar || NEAT || — || align=right | 3.8 km || 
|-id=903 bgcolor=#d6d6d6
| 83903 ||  || — || October 24, 2001 || Kitt Peak || Spacewatch || 3:2 || align=right | 7.8 km || 
|-id=904 bgcolor=#d6d6d6
| 83904 ||  || — || October 18, 2001 || Palomar || NEAT || — || align=right | 7.9 km || 
|-id=905 bgcolor=#d6d6d6
| 83905 ||  || — || October 16, 2001 || Socorro || LINEAR || VER || align=right | 6.3 km || 
|-id=906 bgcolor=#E9E9E9
| 83906 ||  || — || October 16, 2001 || Palomar || NEAT || — || align=right | 4.2 km || 
|-id=907 bgcolor=#d6d6d6
| 83907 ||  || — || October 16, 2001 || Socorro || LINEAR || EOS || align=right | 3.9 km || 
|-id=908 bgcolor=#d6d6d6
| 83908 ||  || — || October 17, 2001 || Socorro || LINEAR || — || align=right | 6.1 km || 
|-id=909 bgcolor=#d6d6d6
| 83909 ||  || — || October 18, 2001 || Socorro || LINEAR || — || align=right | 6.0 km || 
|-id=910 bgcolor=#d6d6d6
| 83910 ||  || — || October 20, 2001 || Haleakala || NEAT || — || align=right | 9.1 km || 
|-id=911 bgcolor=#d6d6d6
| 83911 ||  || — || October 18, 2001 || Socorro || LINEAR || — || align=right | 9.2 km || 
|-id=912 bgcolor=#d6d6d6
| 83912 ||  || — || November 7, 2001 || Palomar || NEAT || — || align=right | 4.8 km || 
|-id=913 bgcolor=#d6d6d6
| 83913 ||  || — || November 9, 2001 || Socorro || LINEAR || — || align=right | 6.2 km || 
|-id=914 bgcolor=#d6d6d6
| 83914 ||  || — || November 9, 2001 || Socorro || LINEAR || THM || align=right | 5.1 km || 
|-id=915 bgcolor=#d6d6d6
| 83915 ||  || — || November 9, 2001 || Socorro || LINEAR || EOS || align=right | 5.3 km || 
|-id=916 bgcolor=#d6d6d6
| 83916 ||  || — || November 9, 2001 || Socorro || LINEAR || HIL3:2 || align=right | 10 km || 
|-id=917 bgcolor=#d6d6d6
| 83917 ||  || — || November 10, 2001 || Socorro || LINEAR || — || align=right | 6.9 km || 
|-id=918 bgcolor=#d6d6d6
| 83918 ||  || — || November 10, 2001 || Socorro || LINEAR || — || align=right | 6.0 km || 
|-id=919 bgcolor=#E9E9E9
| 83919 ||  || — || November 10, 2001 || Socorro || LINEAR || — || align=right | 7.4 km || 
|-id=920 bgcolor=#E9E9E9
| 83920 ||  || — || November 6, 2001 || Palomar || NEAT || TIN || align=right | 5.2 km || 
|-id=921 bgcolor=#E9E9E9
| 83921 ||  || — || November 8, 2001 || Palomar || NEAT || — || align=right | 2.5 km || 
|-id=922 bgcolor=#d6d6d6
| 83922 ||  || — || November 10, 2001 || Palomar || NEAT || — || align=right | 8.2 km || 
|-id=923 bgcolor=#d6d6d6
| 83923 ||  || — || November 10, 2001 || Socorro || LINEAR || 7:4 || align=right | 15 km || 
|-id=924 bgcolor=#d6d6d6
| 83924 ||  || — || November 9, 2001 || Socorro || LINEAR || — || align=right | 3.8 km || 
|-id=925 bgcolor=#d6d6d6
| 83925 ||  || — || November 9, 2001 || Socorro || LINEAR || — || align=right | 6.7 km || 
|-id=926 bgcolor=#E9E9E9
| 83926 ||  || — || November 9, 2001 || Socorro || LINEAR || DOR || align=right | 10 km || 
|-id=927 bgcolor=#E9E9E9
| 83927 ||  || — || November 9, 2001 || Socorro || LINEAR || — || align=right | 4.6 km || 
|-id=928 bgcolor=#d6d6d6
| 83928 ||  || — || November 10, 2001 || Socorro || LINEAR || — || align=right | 7.3 km || 
|-id=929 bgcolor=#d6d6d6
| 83929 ||  || — || November 10, 2001 || Socorro || LINEAR || EOS || align=right | 4.9 km || 
|-id=930 bgcolor=#d6d6d6
| 83930 ||  || — || November 10, 2001 || Socorro || LINEAR || — || align=right | 7.6 km || 
|-id=931 bgcolor=#d6d6d6
| 83931 ||  || — || November 10, 2001 || Socorro || LINEAR || VER || align=right | 9.0 km || 
|-id=932 bgcolor=#d6d6d6
| 83932 ||  || — || November 11, 2001 || Socorro || LINEAR || — || align=right | 6.3 km || 
|-id=933 bgcolor=#E9E9E9
| 83933 ||  || — || November 12, 2001 || Socorro || LINEAR || EUN || align=right | 4.0 km || 
|-id=934 bgcolor=#d6d6d6
| 83934 ||  || — || November 8, 2001 || Palomar || NEAT || TEL || align=right | 3.9 km || 
|-id=935 bgcolor=#E9E9E9
| 83935 ||  || — || November 15, 2001 || Socorro || LINEAR || — || align=right | 5.9 km || 
|-id=936 bgcolor=#E9E9E9
| 83936 ||  || — || November 15, 2001 || Socorro || LINEAR || — || align=right | 4.0 km || 
|-id=937 bgcolor=#d6d6d6
| 83937 ||  || — || November 12, 2001 || Socorro || LINEAR || — || align=right | 6.3 km || 
|-id=938 bgcolor=#d6d6d6
| 83938 ||  || — || November 15, 2001 || Socorro || LINEAR || — || align=right | 4.6 km || 
|-id=939 bgcolor=#d6d6d6
| 83939 ||  || — || November 12, 2001 || Socorro || LINEAR || — || align=right | 8.1 km || 
|-id=940 bgcolor=#d6d6d6
| 83940 ||  || — || November 13, 2001 || Haleakala || NEAT || — || align=right | 8.2 km || 
|-id=941 bgcolor=#d6d6d6
| 83941 || 2001 WD || — || November 16, 2001 || Bisei SG Center || BATTeRS || EOS || align=right | 4.0 km || 
|-id=942 bgcolor=#d6d6d6
| 83942 ||  || — || November 17, 2001 || Socorro || LINEAR || HYG || align=right | 5.5 km || 
|-id=943 bgcolor=#d6d6d6
| 83943 ||  || — || November 19, 2001 || Socorro || LINEAR || 7:4* || align=right | 6.5 km || 
|-id=944 bgcolor=#d6d6d6
| 83944 ||  || — || November 17, 2001 || Socorro || LINEAR || — || align=right | 6.4 km || 
|-id=945 bgcolor=#d6d6d6
| 83945 ||  || — || November 18, 2001 || Socorro || LINEAR || — || align=right | 4.4 km || 
|-id=946 bgcolor=#d6d6d6
| 83946 ||  || — || November 17, 2001 || Socorro || LINEAR || — || align=right | 4.6 km || 
|-id=947 bgcolor=#d6d6d6
| 83947 ||  || — || November 17, 2001 || Socorro || LINEAR || EOS || align=right | 4.6 km || 
|-id=948 bgcolor=#d6d6d6
| 83948 ||  || — || November 17, 2001 || Socorro || LINEAR || HYG || align=right | 7.7 km || 
|-id=949 bgcolor=#E9E9E9
| 83949 ||  || — || November 19, 2001 || Socorro || LINEAR || — || align=right | 4.6 km || 
|-id=950 bgcolor=#d6d6d6
| 83950 ||  || — || November 20, 2001 || Socorro || LINEAR || — || align=right | 6.2 km || 
|-id=951 bgcolor=#d6d6d6
| 83951 ||  || — || November 20, 2001 || Socorro || LINEAR || — || align=right | 4.9 km || 
|-id=952 bgcolor=#d6d6d6
| 83952 ||  || — || November 20, 2001 || Socorro || LINEAR || HYG || align=right | 5.5 km || 
|-id=953 bgcolor=#d6d6d6
| 83953 ||  || — || November 18, 2001 || Kitt Peak || Spacewatch || — || align=right | 4.8 km || 
|-id=954 bgcolor=#E9E9E9
| 83954 ||  || — || November 19, 2001 || Anderson Mesa || LONEOS || — || align=right | 4.6 km || 
|-id=955 bgcolor=#d6d6d6
| 83955 ||  || — || December 8, 2001 || Kitt Peak || Spacewatch || — || align=right | 3.5 km || 
|-id=956 bgcolor=#E9E9E9
| 83956 Panuzzo ||  ||  || December 7, 2001 || Cima Ekar || ADAS || — || align=right | 6.5 km || 
|-id=957 bgcolor=#d6d6d6
| 83957 ||  || — || December 9, 2001 || Socorro || LINEAR || EOS || align=right | 5.6 km || 
|-id=958 bgcolor=#E9E9E9
| 83958 ||  || — || December 9, 2001 || Socorro || LINEAR || slow || align=right | 5.1 km || 
|-id=959 bgcolor=#d6d6d6
| 83959 ||  || — || December 11, 2001 || Socorro || LINEAR || URS || align=right | 7.7 km || 
|-id=960 bgcolor=#E9E9E9
| 83960 ||  || — || December 11, 2001 || Socorro || LINEAR || POS || align=right | 7.5 km || 
|-id=961 bgcolor=#E9E9E9
| 83961 ||  || — || December 11, 2001 || Socorro || LINEAR || — || align=right | 4.6 km || 
|-id=962 bgcolor=#d6d6d6
| 83962 ||  || — || December 14, 2001 || Socorro || LINEAR || — || align=right | 4.7 km || 
|-id=963 bgcolor=#E9E9E9
| 83963 ||  || — || December 11, 2001 || Socorro || LINEAR || GEF || align=right | 3.9 km || 
|-id=964 bgcolor=#E9E9E9
| 83964 ||  || — || December 7, 2001 || Socorro || LINEAR || — || align=right | 4.3 km || 
|-id=965 bgcolor=#d6d6d6
| 83965 ||  || — || December 7, 2001 || Socorro || LINEAR || AEG || align=right | 7.3 km || 
|-id=966 bgcolor=#d6d6d6
| 83966 ||  || — || December 17, 2001 || Socorro || LINEAR || — || align=right | 5.5 km || 
|-id=967 bgcolor=#d6d6d6
| 83967 ||  || — || December 17, 2001 || Anderson Mesa || LONEOS || — || align=right | 7.1 km || 
|-id=968 bgcolor=#d6d6d6
| 83968 ||  || — || December 17, 2001 || Socorro || LINEAR || — || align=right | 9.4 km || 
|-id=969 bgcolor=#d6d6d6
| 83969 ||  || — || December 17, 2001 || Socorro || LINEAR || EOS || align=right | 4.1 km || 
|-id=970 bgcolor=#E9E9E9
| 83970 ||  || — || December 20, 2001 || Socorro || LINEAR || — || align=right | 3.4 km || 
|-id=971 bgcolor=#E9E9E9
| 83971 ||  || — || January 9, 2002 || Haleakala || NEAT || GAL || align=right | 5.0 km || 
|-id=972 bgcolor=#d6d6d6
| 83972 ||  || — || January 9, 2002 || Kingsnake || J. V. McClusky || — || align=right | 7.8 km || 
|-id=973 bgcolor=#d6d6d6
| 83973 ||  || — || January 5, 2002 || Palomar || NEAT || 627 || align=right | 11 km || 
|-id=974 bgcolor=#E9E9E9
| 83974 ||  || — || January 5, 2002 || Palomar || NEAT || — || align=right | 4.1 km || 
|-id=975 bgcolor=#C2FFFF
| 83975 ||  || — || January 6, 2002 || Kitt Peak || Spacewatch || L4 || align=right | 17 km || 
|-id=976 bgcolor=#d6d6d6
| 83976 ||  || — || February 9, 2002 || Desert Eagle || W. K. Y. Yeung || — || align=right | 4.0 km || 
|-id=977 bgcolor=#C2FFFF
| 83977 ||  || — || February 7, 2002 || Socorro || LINEAR || L4 || align=right | 17 km || 
|-id=978 bgcolor=#C2FFFF
| 83978 ||  || — || February 10, 2002 || Socorro || LINEAR || L4 || align=right | 18 km || 
|-id=979 bgcolor=#C2FFFF
| 83979 ||  || — || March 11, 2002 || Palomar || NEAT || L4 || align=right | 20 km || 
|-id=980 bgcolor=#C2FFFF
| 83980 ||  || — || March 10, 2002 || Palomar || NEAT || L4 || align=right | 16 km || 
|-id=981 bgcolor=#C2FFFF
| 83981 ||  || — || March 10, 2002 || Haleakala || NEAT || L4 || align=right | 17 km || 
|-id=982 bgcolor=#C7FF8F
| 83982 Crantor ||  ||  || April 12, 2002 || Palomar || NEAT || centaur || align=right | 73 km || 
|-id=983 bgcolor=#C2FFFF
| 83983 ||  || — || April 4, 2002 || Palomar || NEAT || L4 || align=right | 22 km || 
|-id=984 bgcolor=#C2FFFF
| 83984 ||  || — || April 9, 2002 || Anderson Mesa || LONEOS || L4 || align=right | 14 km || 
|-id=985 bgcolor=#E9E9E9
| 83985 ||  || — || May 8, 2002 || Socorro || LINEAR || — || align=right | 2.6 km || 
|-id=986 bgcolor=#fefefe
| 83986 ||  || — || May 9, 2002 || Socorro || LINEAR || — || align=right | 2.3 km || 
|-id=987 bgcolor=#d6d6d6
| 83987 ||  || — || June 11, 2002 || Fountain Hills || C. W. Juels, P. R. Holvorcem || — || align=right | 8.1 km || 
|-id=988 bgcolor=#FA8072
| 83988 ||  || — || June 10, 2002 || Socorro || LINEAR || — || align=right | 1.6 km || 
|-id=989 bgcolor=#fefefe
| 83989 ||  || — || June 17, 2002 || Socorro || LINEAR || PHO || align=right | 3.0 km || 
|-id=990 bgcolor=#fefefe
| 83990 ||  || — || June 17, 2002 || Socorro || LINEAR || H || align=right | 1.9 km || 
|-id=991 bgcolor=#E9E9E9
| 83991 ||  || — || June 20, 2002 || Socorro || LINEAR || — || align=right | 9.2 km || 
|-id=992 bgcolor=#FA8072
| 83992 ||  || — || June 25, 2002 || Haleakala || NEAT || — || align=right | 2.1 km || 
|-id=993 bgcolor=#fefefe
| 83993 ||  || — || June 19, 2002 || Socorro || LINEAR || H || align=right | 1.3 km || 
|-id=994 bgcolor=#E9E9E9
| 83994 ||  || — || July 4, 2002 || Palomar || NEAT || — || align=right | 2.2 km || 
|-id=995 bgcolor=#fefefe
| 83995 ||  || — || July 4, 2002 || Palomar || NEAT || NYS || align=right | 1.4 km || 
|-id=996 bgcolor=#fefefe
| 83996 ||  || — || July 9, 2002 || Socorro || LINEAR || — || align=right | 1.9 km || 
|-id=997 bgcolor=#fefefe
| 83997 ||  || — || July 9, 2002 || Socorro || LINEAR || FLO || align=right | 1.5 km || 
|-id=998 bgcolor=#fefefe
| 83998 ||  || — || July 9, 2002 || Socorro || LINEAR || V || align=right | 1.5 km || 
|-id=999 bgcolor=#fefefe
| 83999 ||  || — || July 9, 2002 || Socorro || LINEAR || — || align=right | 2.0 km || 
|-id=000 bgcolor=#fefefe
| 84000 ||  || — || July 9, 2002 || Socorro || LINEAR || NYS || align=right | 1.6 km || 
|}

References

External links 
 Discovery Circumstances: Numbered Minor Planets (80001)–(85000) (IAU Minor Planet Center)

0083